= Lynds' Catalogue =

Lynds' Catalogue may refer to either of the following astronomical catalogues compiled by American astronomer Beverly Turner Lynds:

- Lynds' Catalogue of Bright Nebulae (LBN)
- Lynds' Catalogue of Dark Nebulae (LDN)
