= VV 191 =

Interacting pair in the constellation of Boötes

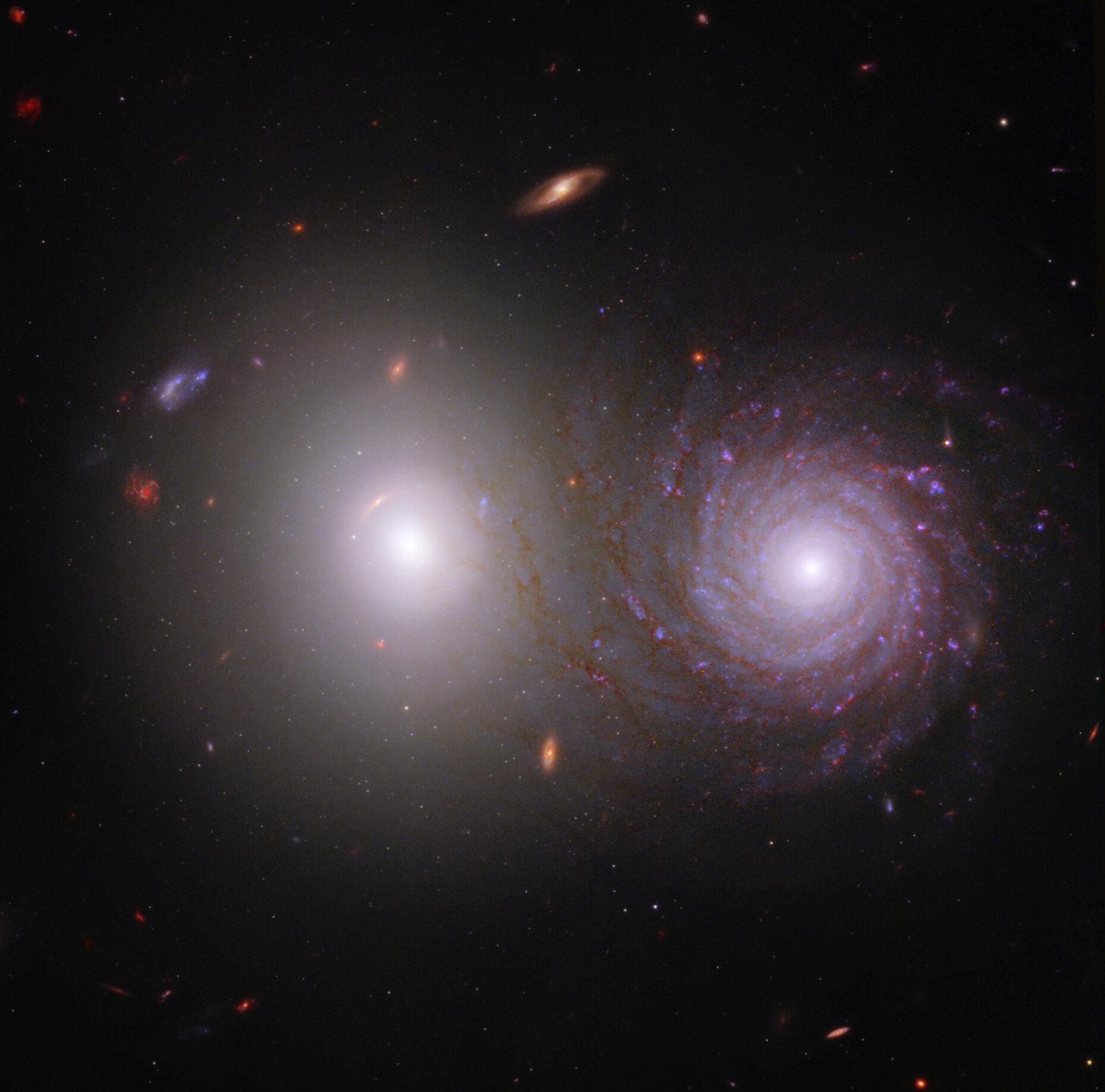
- The galaxy pair VV 191 captured by both HST and JWST

Observation data (J2000 epoch)
- Constellation: Boötes
- Right ascension: 13^{h} 48^{m} 21.77^{s}
- Declination: +25° 40′ 31.11″
- Redshift: 0.051297
- Heliocentric radial velocity: 15,378 km/s
- Distance: 741.4 ± 51.9 Mly (227.32 ± 15.91 Mpc)
- Magnitude (J): 13.35

Characteristics
- Size: ~349,000 ly (106.9 kpc) (estimated) (VV 191a), ~134,100 ly (41.13 kpc) (estimated) (VV 191b)

Other designations
- HOLM 544, CGCG 132-015, PGC 48974/48981, MCG +04-33-006 and MCG +04-33-005, PGC 48973/48980

VV 191 known as HOLM 544, is a pair of interacting galaxies in the constellation of Boötes. It has been classified as an overlapping pair, where the spiral galaxy is described as backlit by an elliptical galaxy companion.

== Description ==
VV 191 is made up of two separate galaxies. The first galaxy is VV 191a and it has been classified as an elliptical galaxy. Its redshift has been estimated to be at (z) 0.0512 or (z) 0.0513. The second galaxy in the system, VV 191b, has been classified as a multi-armed spiral galaxy of type Sc and has a redshift of (z) 0.0514. The pair of galaxies have been described as overlapping, but in reality they are separated physically. VV 191a is also a background galaxy, with an extension of up to around 1.7 kiloparsecs from the center of the spiral galaxy companion. A study also found the spiral galaxy is rotating symmetrically, with its dust lanes being described as both partially overlapping and nonoverlapping. The nuclei of the galaxies are estimated to be 20.6 kiloparsecs away from each other.

A study published in March 2024, records 154 globular clusters around the elliptical galaxy, with most having an estimated mass of around 10^{6.5} M_{☉}. The spiral companion contains a population of young stars with mean ages of 10^{7} to 10^{8} million years. A photodissociation region has also been discovered in the outer disk of the spiral galaxy 17 kiloparsecs from the optical center and there is evidence of a spiral arm dust cavity feature surrounding the entire region. This indicates the production of polycyclic aromatic hydrocarbon emission. The dust lanes of the spiral galaxy continue beyond the region of the spiral arms which then trace in a complex web pattern. A lens arc is found a few arcseconds away from the center of the elliptical galaxy, suggesting the possibility of gravitational lensing.
