= PZ Cassiopeiae =

Star in the constellation Cassiopeia

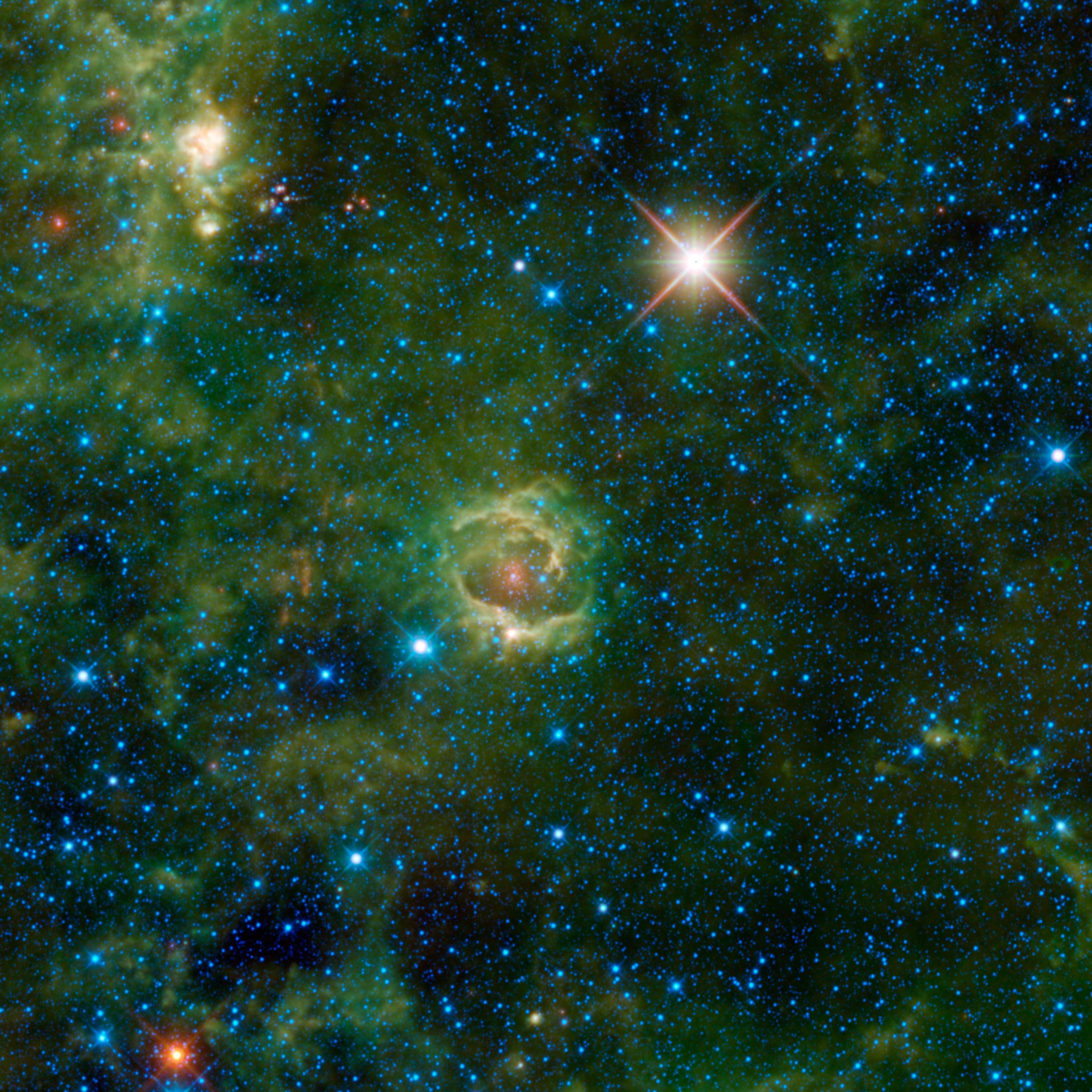
- PZ Cassiopeiae is the bright star towards the upper right in this WISE infrared image of the nebula LBN 114.55+00.22 and the bright red star in the lower left corner of this image IRAS 23304+6147.

Observation data Epoch J2000 Equinox ICRS
- Constellation: Cassiopeia
- Right ascension: 23^{h} 44^{m} 03.28104^{s}
- Declination: +61° 47′ 22.1823″
- Apparent magnitude (V): 8.2 – 10.2

Characteristics
- Evolutionary stage: Red supergiant or hypergiant
- Spectral type: M3Iab
- U−B color index: +1.32
- B−V color index: +2.58
- Variable type: SRc + Cepheid

Astrometry
Radial velocity (R_{v})	–45.68 km/s
Proper motion (μ)	RA: −4.15 mas/yr Dec.: −3.55 mas/yr
Parallax (π)	0.356±0.026 mas
Distance	9,200+720 −620 ly (2,810+220 −190 pc)
Absolute magnitude (M_{V})	−7.89

Details
Mass	20 or 25 (initial mass) M_{☉}
Radius	1,260–1,340 (Note: Applying the Stefan–Boltzmann law with a nominal solar effective temperature of 5,772 K: $\sqrt{\biggl(\frac{5,772}{3,600}\biggr)^4 \cdot 240,000} = 1,260\ R_\odot$. $\sqrt{\biggl(\frac{5,772}{3,600}\biggr)^4 \cdot 270,000} = 1,340\ R_\odot$.) R_{☉}
Luminosity	229,000, (240,000 – 270,000) L_{☉}
Surface gravity (log g)	−0.5 cgs
Temperature	3,605 K
Age	8 or 10 Myr

Other designations
- RAFGL 3138, PZ Cas, BD+60°2613, HIP 117078, IRC +60417

Database references
SIMBAD	data

PZ Cassiopeiae is a red supergiant or hypergiant star located in the constellation of Cassiopeia, and a semi-regular variable star.

== Characteristics ==
PZ Cassiopeiae is a luminous red supergiant star, one of the largest stars currently known with a radius over 1,200 times the Sun's radius (R_{☉}), and also one of the most luminous of its type, over 200,000 times more luminous than the Sun (L_{☉}). It is likely to be part of the Cas OB5 stellar association although apparently much younger than the other stars in the association. The star is losing mass at around 2.6×10^{−5} M_{☉} per year and has also once been described as a hypergiant.

Its distance from Earth was initially estimated to be around 7,800 light-years (2.4 kiloparsecs). A 2013 study of the star using the water masers that surround it refined both the distance and the parameters of this star, deriving an accurate parallax of 0.356±0.026 mas, corresponding to a distance of 2,800 parsecs (9,100 light-years), that translates a luminosity for it around 229,000 L_{☉}, and an initial mass of 20 to 25 times that of the Sun. These parameters are all similar to those estimated for the red hypergiant VY Canis Majoris.

A less reliable Gaia Data Release 2 parallax of 0.42±0.09 mas gives the star a luminosity below 180,000 L_{☉} with a corresponding radius of 1,062 R_{☉}.

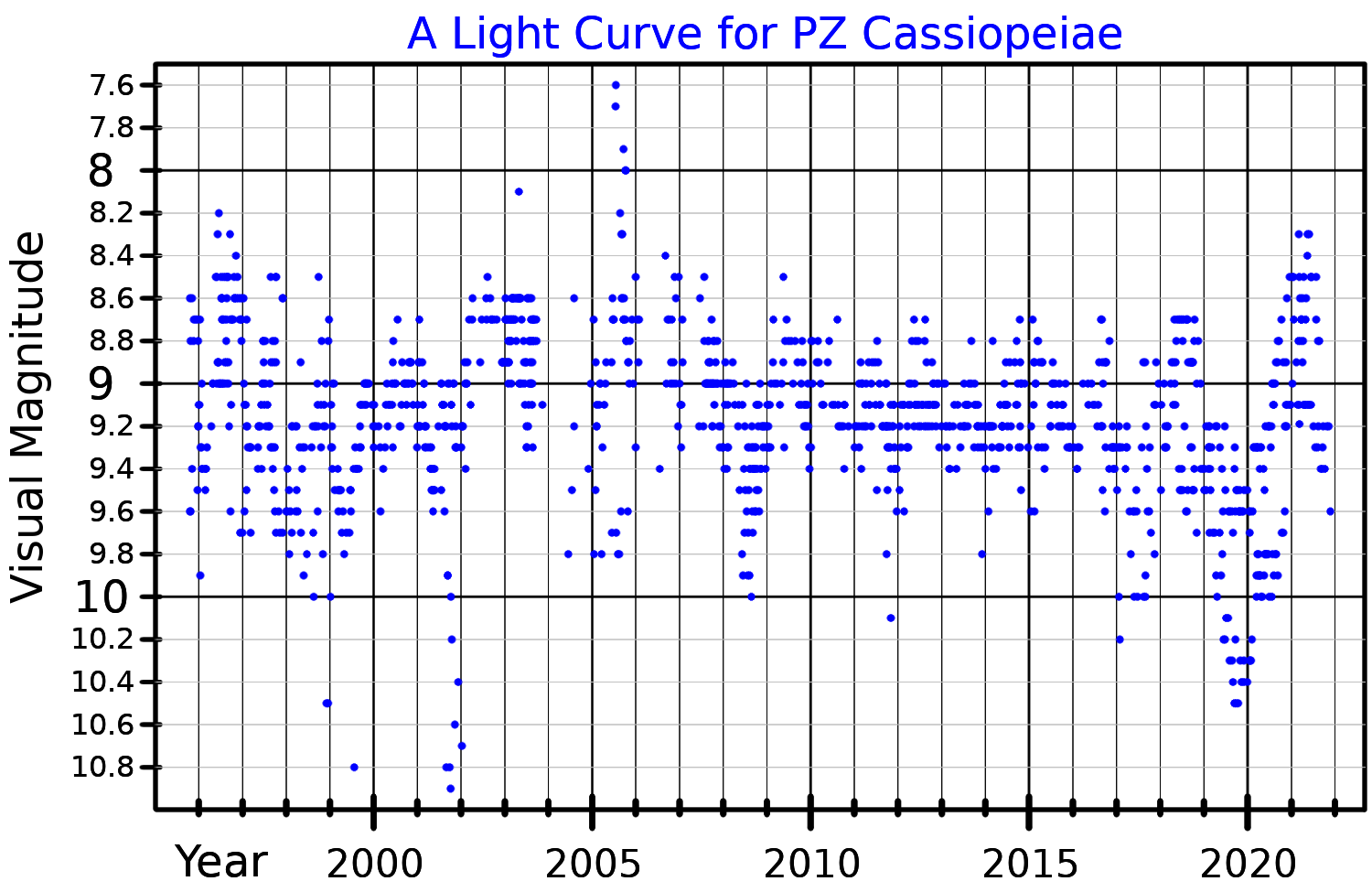
A visual band light curve of PZ Cassiopeiae, from AAVSO data

In 1956, R. Weber announced his discovery that the star's brightness varies. PZ Cas is a slow semi-regular variable star with the period quoted as 925 days in the General Catalogue of Variable Stars, although periods of 850 and 3,195 days have been derived. The visual range is approximate magnitude 8–10, large for this type of variable.

== Supergiant or AGB star ==
PZ Cas has traditionally been treated as a massive supergiant, comparable to others such as VY CMa, but there is some evidence that it is a possible less massive O-rich S- or SC-type Asymptotic Giant Branch (AGB) or post-AGB star. It shows enrichment of Zr and Ba, but not Li as would be expected for a true supergiant.

== Companion ==
PZ Cas has a Cepheid variable companion, a 13th magnitude star 12" away.

== See also ==
- S Persei
- VX Sagittarii
