= IRAS 23304+6147 =

Star in the constellation Cassiopeia

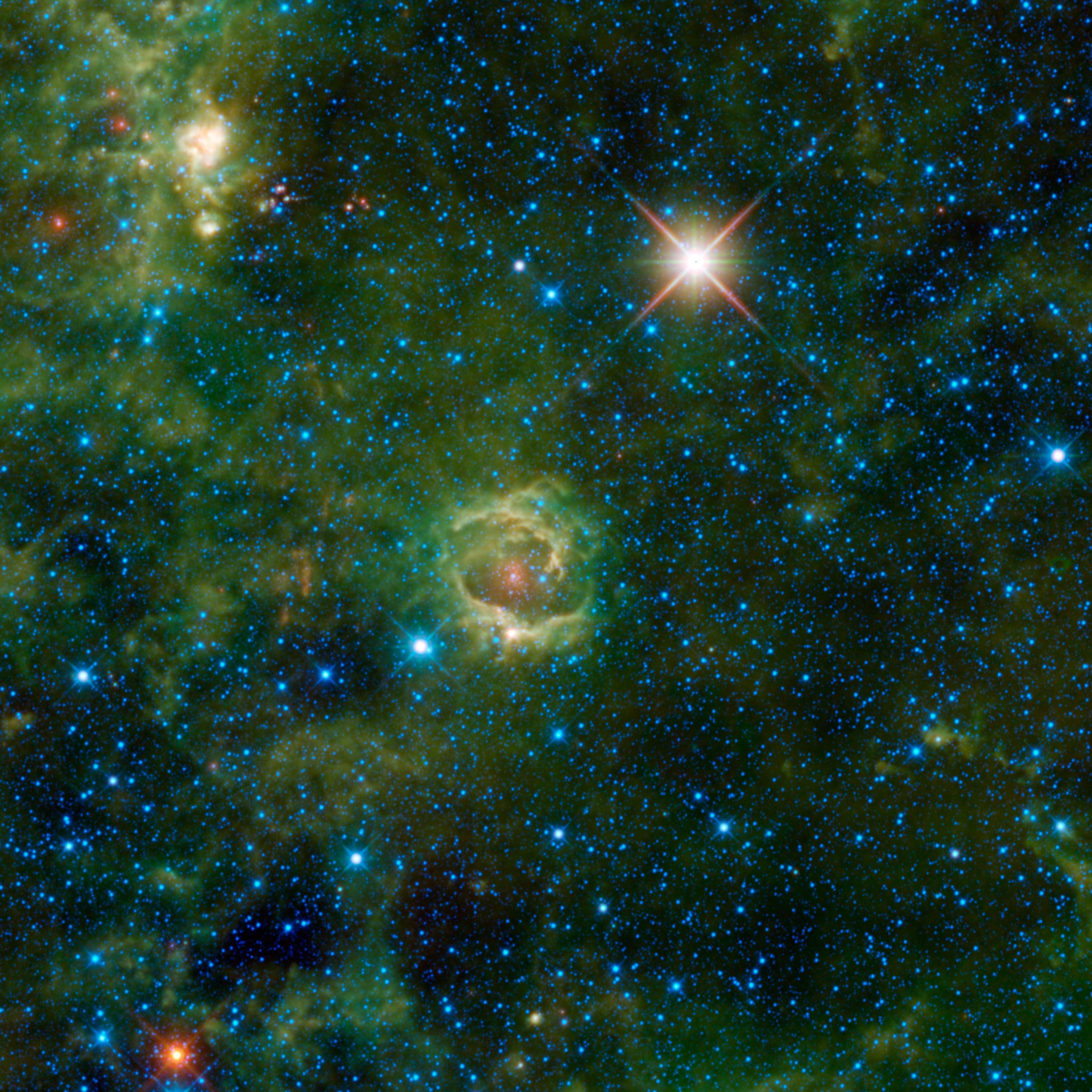
- The bright red star in the lower left corner of this image of the nebula LBN 114.55+00.22 is IRAS 23304+6147. The very bright star is PZ Cas.

Observation data Epoch J2000.0 Equinox ICRS
- Constellation: Cassiopeia
- Right ascension: 23^{h} 32^{m} 44.79^{s}
- Declination: +62° 03′ 49.1″
- Apparent magnitude (V): 12.99 - 13.15

Characteristics
- Evolutionary stage: post-AGB
- Spectral type: G2Ia
- B−V color index: +2.31 - +2.37
- Variable type: Lb

Astrometry
Proper motion (μ)	RA: −3.731 mas/yr Dec.: −1.930 mas/yr
Parallax (π)	0.2366±0.0280 mas
Distance	approx. 14,000 ly (approx. 4,200 pc)

Details
Mass	2.8 M_{☉}
Radius	171 R_{☉}
Luminosity	8,318 L_{☉}
Surface gravity (log g)	0.0 cgs
Temperature	5,900 K
Metallicity [Fe/H]	−0.61 dex
Age	100 Myr

Other designations
- 2MASS J23324479+6203491

Database references
SIMBAD	data

IRAS 23304+6147 is a protoplanetary nebula in the constellation Cassiopeia, 16,000 light years away. The central star is a G-type supergiant.

The nebula is carbon-rich and contains silicon, suggesting that it was formed by a star which was more massive than 4 M_{☉}. Its spectrum also shows other s-process elements such as barium, yttrium, and lanthanum.

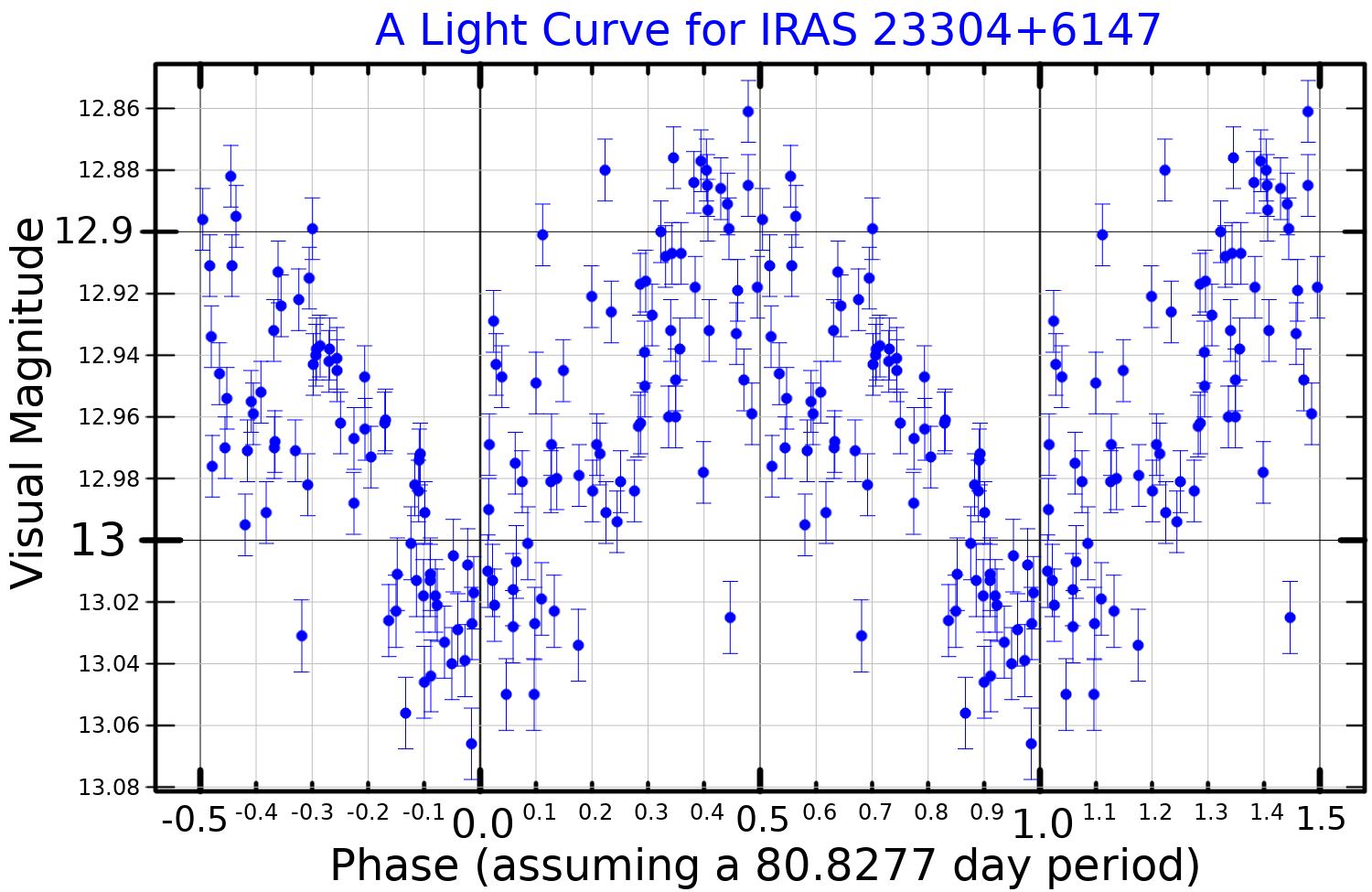
A visual band light curve for IRAS 23304+6147, plotted from ASAS-SN data

The central star of the protoplanetary nebula has been found to be variable with a small range from visual magnitude +12.99 to +13.15. Although several periods have been identified, these change from year to year and the star has been classified as irregular. The optical variability is dominated by slow pulsation with 83.8 d period, overlapped by faster pulsation modes.

IRAS 23304+6147 is about 15,000 light years away and over eight thousand times as luminous as the sun. It lies in the direction of the Cassiopeia OB7 stellar association, but is thought to be further away.
