= Katherine Rosman =

American writer and reporter

- Born: Katherine Barnett Rosman; March 2, 1972 (age 54); Detroit, Michigan
- Education: University of Michigan
- Occupation: Journalist
- Years active: 1995–present
- Spouse: Joe Ehrlich (m. 2002)

Katherine Barnett Rosman (born March 2, 1972) is an American writer and reporter who works as a domestic correspondent for The New York Times, previously at The Wall Street Journal.

== Early life and education ==
Katherine Rosman was born in Detroit, Michigan, to Bob Rosman and Suzanne "Suzy" Rosin (1944-2005), who met while attending the University of Michigan. In Rosman's youth, her mother remarried Robert Rosin. Her maternal grandfather, Leo Goldberg, was a renowned scientist. She graduated from the University of Michigan College of Literature, Science, and the Arts in 1994 with a Bachelor of Arts degree. She has three sisters, all of whom grew up in the Detroit area. Her mother was the basis of her 2008 book.

Rosman is of Polish Jewish descent through her mother and Russian-Jewish descent through her father. Her paternal grandfather, Carl Rosman (1914–2005), arrived at Ellis Island on August 4, 1922, on the S.S. Berengaria with his parents Emanuel and Rose and his sisters Irma and Berta from Transylvania. On other sides of the family, she is of Sephardic descent from Spain, Italy, and other Southeastern European countries; from Purcăreni, and other Ashkenazi and Sephardic regions.

== Career ==
Rosman moved to New York City and became an assistant to Elaina Richardson at Elle magazine. In 2004, she was hired as a staff reporter by The Wall Street Journal. In 2014, she joined the staff of The New York Times. She is the author of the memoir, If You Knew Suzy, published by HarperCollins in 2010. Rosman was a finalist in the feature category for the Gerald Loeb Awards for her story, "The Itsy-Bitsy, Teenie-Weenie, Very Litigious Bikini". She has been written about by the Harvard Business Review based on her "Survival Guide to Journalism in the Social Media Age". In February 2019, a story by Rosman caused a Times reporter and photographer to be disinvited from the Vanity Fair Oscar party. Dylan Byers, a senior media reporter at NBC and MSNBC tweeted, "I have decided not to attend this year's Vanity Fair Oscars party in light of their decision to ban the [New York Times] on account of their very legitimate reporting. The decision to ban the Times because of critical reporting is incongruous with journalistic values Vanity Fair claims to uphold." A Times reporter, Edmund Lee, also tweeted of the event, "After great reporting by [Katherine Rosman and Brooks Barnes] on Vanity Fair Oscars party, Conde Nast saw fit to ban Times reporters from covering the event. This, from a publication that touts journalism." Others protested the event as well. She also starred in a 2019 documentary called Secrets of Sugar Baby Dating, directed by Joyce Trozzo in relation to a story she wrote an article called "A 'Sugar Date' Gone Sour" on October 15, 2018, then "The 'Sugar Dater'" on October 19, 2018, followed by more.

Rosman continues to write about current events, publishing a fluctuating amount of articles in The New York Times each month. In January 2023, The New York Times announced that Rosman would depart from the Styles section "after a run of enthralling stories" and move to the Metro section. Since then, Rosman has contributed narratives of individuals, relationships and more within New York, Connecticut, and New Jersey.

Rosman was a winner of the Best in Business Award from the Society of American Business Editors in 2018. In 2024, Rosman wrote The New York Times's most engaged article of the year, and the fourth-most globally.

== Personal life ==
Rosman resides in New York City with her husband, Joe Ehrlich, and two children, Ariel Ehrlich and Eleanor Ehrlich. Ehrlich is the grandson of Dr. Jerome Schein and a descendant of the Penn family.
