= Leo Goldberg =

American astronomer

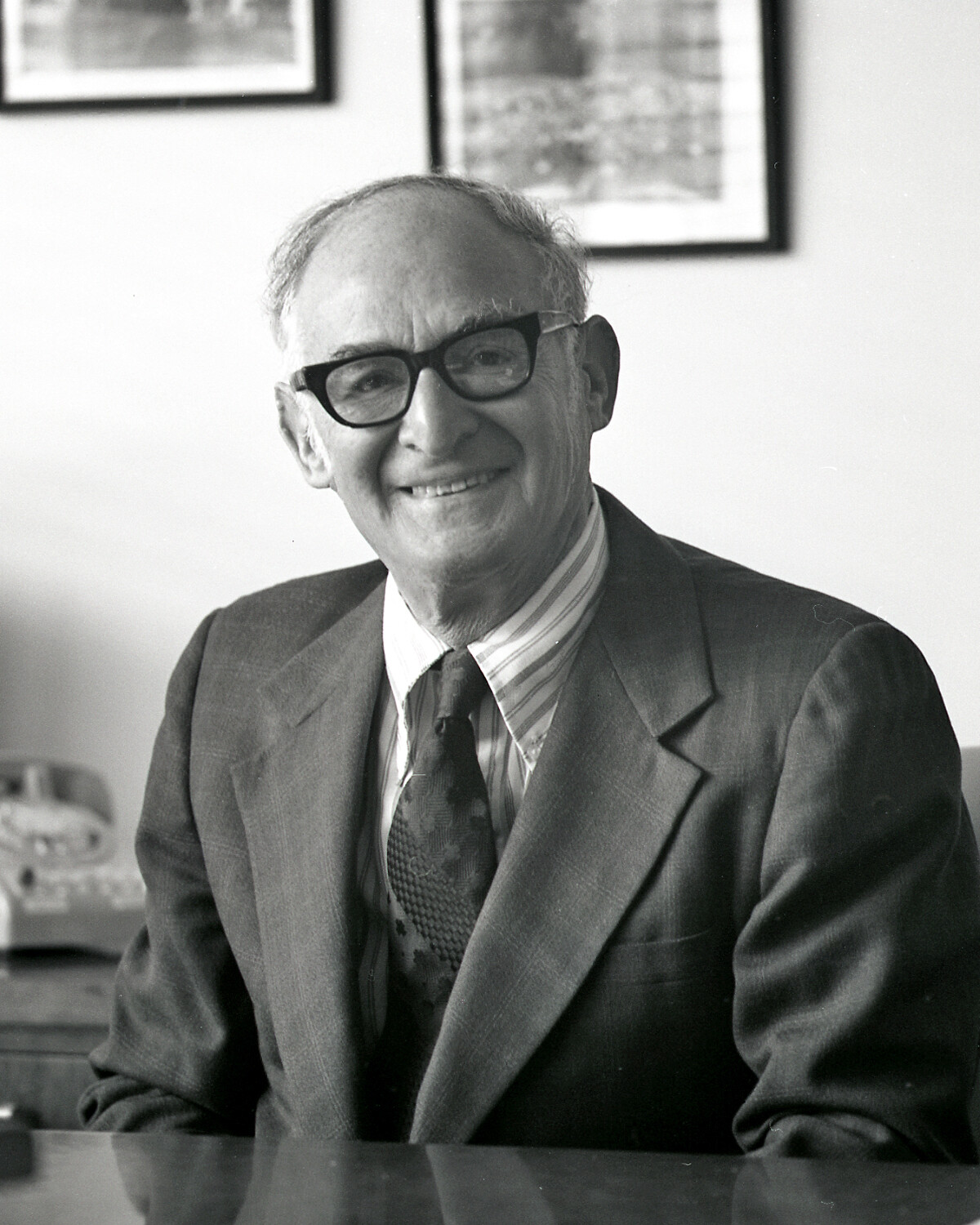
- Born: Leopold Goldberg; January 26, 1913; Brooklyn, New York, U.S.
- Died: November 1, 1987 (aged 74); Tucson, Arizona, U.S.
- Education: Harvard University
- Occupation: Astronomer
- Spouses: Charlotte Belle Wyman (m. 1943, divorced) Beverly Turner Lynds (m. 1987)
- Children: 3
- Relatives: Katherine Rosman (granddaughter)
- Scientific career
- Thesis: The Intensities of Helium Lines (1938)
- Doctoral advisor: Donald Howard Menzel

Leopold Goldberg (26 January 1913 – 1 November 1987) was an American astronomer who held professorships at Harvard and the University of Michigan and the directorships of several major observatories. He was president of both the International Astronomical Union and the American Astronomical Society. His research focused on solar physics and the application of atomic physics to astronomy, and he led many of the early efforts to study the Sun from space telescopes.

== Early life ==
Goldberg was born in the Brooklyn borough of New York City to Jewish immigrant parents, Harry and Rose Goldberg née Ambush, from eastern Poland (then part of the Russian Empire). He lived in a tenement building in Brooklyn with his parents and two brothers, two sisters, one brother two years older and the other some eight years younger until a fire destroyed the tenement in 1922. The fire killed his mother and infant brother and hospitalized the nine-year-old Leo and his older brother. Goldberg was in a hospital for some months and his brother for over a year. In 1924 Goldberg's father remarried to Bertha Sherer, and they had two children together, Lilian and Harold. A year later the family moved to New Bedford, Massachusetts. His father, a milliner, set up a store there and Goldberg worked there on his evenings and weekends during his high school years.

Goldberg was encouraged by career guidance counselors at the school to pursue a career in engineering since he did well in science and math classes. He originally decided to apply to MIT, but since this would have put him and his brother—who had been placed in the same year as him because of his extended hospital stay—in competition for a single scholarship, supposedly because of their religion, he decided to withdraw and work in his father's store for another year.

In 1930 he enrolled in the Harvard Engineering School on a tuition scholarship from the New Bedford Harvard Club. While there he took an introductory astronomy course and decided to change his major to astronomy at the start of his fourth year.

== Personal life ==
On July 9, 1943, Goldberg married Charlotte Belle Wyman, and they married in a Jewish ceremony in Pontiac, Michigan. In 1944, they had a daughter, Suzanne, in Pontiac, Michigan. They then had David in 1946, followed by Edward in 1951. The family lived in Michigan, and then in Massachusetts in the 1960s, and eventually to Tucson, Arizona where both Leopold and Charlotte died, although divorced at the times of their deaths. In January 1987 Goldberg married Beverly Turner Lynds, an astronomer who worked at Kitt Peak National Observatory from 1971 until 1986, briefly serving as the Assistant Director. On November 1, 1987, Goldberg died in Tucson.

== Academic career ==
Goldberg received his Ph.D. in astronomy in 1938, also from Harvard. He remained there for three years after graduating on a special research fellowship, before being appointed to the staff of the McMath–Hulbert Observatory in Lake Angelus, Michigan in 1941. While there he worked on an anti-submarine project during World War II.

In 1946 he was given the job of department chairman and observatory director at Michigan, where he began filling gaps left by a series of recent retirements, deaths, and resignations. He procured several new telescopes for the university, including an 85-foot radio dish to exploit the new and growing field of radio astronomy. He also began espousing the possibilities of space-based observations of astronomical objects and particularly the Sun, but received little support in this idea—which would have necessitated significant investment in infrastructure—from the university administration.

He remained at Michigan until 1960, when he returned to Harvard to take up a professorship. Six years later he was made chair of Harvard's astronomy department and directory of its observatory. He was the Editor of the Annual Review of Astronomy and Astrophysics from 1963 to 1973.

=== Research ===
Goldberg worked extensively in the fields of Solar physics and spectroscopy. Much of his work was carried out using observations from satellites, including the fourth and sixth Orbiting Solar Observatories and the space station Skylab.

== International Astronomical Union ==
Goldberg began to play an active role in the IAU while at Michigan, acting as chair of the U.S. delegations to the 10th and 11th general assemblies in 1958 and 1961. The 1958 meeting was held in Moscow, and despite the ongoing Cold War the Russians had allowed delegates from all member countries to attend. The Americans wished to host the next meeting, in 1961, on the same terms. This would require clearing the offer with the State Department under Secretary John Foster Dulles, and in particular his science adviser Wallace Brode. Brode, a strong anti-Communist, objected to the fact that the Communist People's Republic of China was a member of the IAU while the democratic Republic of China was not. He wanted Goldberg to present the U.S.'s invitation at the 1958 meeting, but with the condition that the ROC would be admitted immediately.

Goldberg refused this demand on the grounds that the ROC—which at the time had no practicing research astronomers—would have to apply and be considered in the usual way. He also objected to the idea that the invitation to the 1961 meeting should be contingent on the ROC's acceptance. He offered to resign his position as delegate, but the National Academy of Sciences gave him their support and the ROC's application was allowed to proceed normally. The country was admitted in 1959 and the 11th assembly went ahead as planned, with Goldberg chairing the U.S. delegation.

Goldberg was elected one of the six Vice-Presidents of the IAU in 1958 and served two consecutive three-year terms, ending in 1964. In 1973 he became president, and served for three years.

== Honors ==
- Elected to the American Academy of Arts and Sciences, 1956.
- Elected to the United States National Academy of Sciences, 1958.
- Elected to the American Philosophical Society, 1958.
- NASA Distinguished Service Medal, 1973
- Honorary degrees from the University of Massachusetts (1970), University of Michigan (1974), and University of Arizona (1977).
- American Astronomical Society's George Ellery Hale Prize, 1984
- In 2006 the National Optical Astronomy Observatory renamed its NOAO Five Year Post-Doctoral Fellowship after Goldberg.
