= NGC 7142 =

Open cluster in the constellation Cepheus

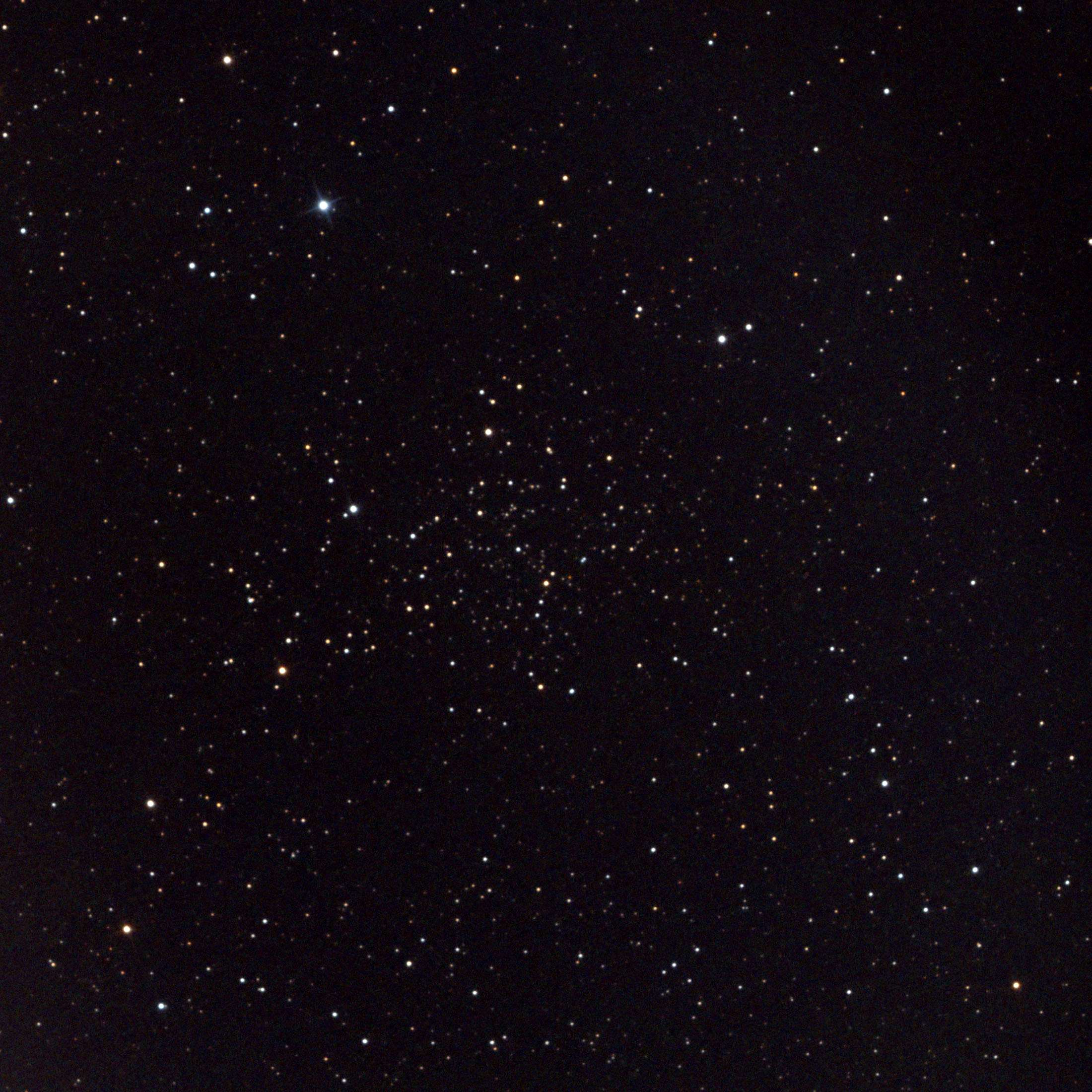

Observation data (J2000 epoch)
- Right ascension: 21^{h} 45^{m} 10.0^{s}
- Declination: +65° 46′ 18″
- Distance: ~6,200 ly (~1,900 pc)
- Apparent magnitude (V): 9.3

Physical characteristics
- Estimated age: Between 3×10^{9} yr and 6×10^{9} yr
- Other designations: Cr 442, C 2144+655

Associations
- Constellation: Cepheus

NGC 7142 is an open cluster about 6,200 light-years away in the constellation Cepheus.

Due to the observational difficulties NGC 7142 presents, it has been an infrequent topic of research. Current known studies include only work being done at the University of Kansas.

== Description ==
NGC 7142 is located near the reflection nebula NGC 7129, which is a first indication that the cluster may be obscured by an interstellar cloud. Many studies have demonstrated this to be true dating back to the earliest investigations of this cluster. A thorough study of the Cepheus region concluded "that no part of the field may be considered unobscured."

Other astronomers have noted that the reddening across the face of this cluster is likely to be uneven. The visibility of several background galaxies in the NW corner of the cluster indicate that the obscuring medium may be lowest here. Estimates of the amount of reddening range from 0.18 magnitudes, to as high as 0.41 magnitudes.

Due to the uncertain amount of interstellar reddening, precise determination of age for this cluster has been especially difficult. Based on NGC 7142's color-magnitude diagram, it is believed that this cluster is close in age to the old open clusters M 67 and NGC 188 (although age determinations for these two clusters varies wildly in the literature). This makes it one of the oldest open clusters currently known.

Although thought to be an old cluster, NGC 7142 contains a surprisingly high number of blue stars. This runs contrary to the standard model of cluster evolution which predicts that old clusters should be devoid of such stars since bluer stars are more massive and thus evolve and die off faster, which should prevent them from still being present. Such stars are said to be blue stragglers.

The distance to this cluster has also been difficult to determine, again, owing to the absorption. Estimates for the distance modulus range from 12.5 to 14.5.

Due to the similarities between NGC 7142 and NGC 188 in both age and density, some astronomers have speculated that NGC 7142 should be home to a high number of a rare type of variable star known as W UMa since NGC 188 has a high number. Crinklaw & Talbert conducted a search for such stars in 1991, but their study only revealed one variable star. However, their investigation only spanned two days, which did not afford enough data points to determine the type of variable. Roughly two more nights of data were appended to the beginning of the Crinklaw & Talbert study but have still not given enough information to classify the variable star.
