= Lynds' Catalogue of Bright Nebulae =

Catalogue of bright nebulae

- Alternative names: LBN
- Survey type: Nebula Catalog (excluding dark nebulae)
- Named after: Beverly Lynds
- Wavelength: visible light
- Related media on Commons

Lynds' Catalogue of Bright Nebulae (abbreviation: LBN) is an astronomical catalogue of bright nebulae.

Objects listed in the catalogue are numbered with the prefix LBN (not to be confused with LDN, or Lynds' Catalogue of Dark Nebulae). Many entries in the catalogue also have other designations; for example, LBN 974, the Orion Nebula is also known as M42 and NGC 1976.

It was originally compiled in the 1960s by Beverly Lynds. Objects in the catalogue include (among other things) the coordinates of nebulae, brightness from 1 to 6 (with 1 being the brightest and 6 being barely detectable), colour and size and cross-references to other astronomical catalogues if listed elsewhere. In total, the catalog contains 1125 items.

== Notable entries ==
Number	Common name	Image	Other catalogues
LBN 25	Lagoon Nebula		Sh 2-25, NGC 6302, Sharpless 25, RCW 146, Gum 72
LBN 27	Trifid Nebula		M20, NGC 6514, Sharpless 30, RCW 147, Gum 76
LBN 47	Twiddlebug Nebula		Gum 78, IC 1283/4, RCW 153
LBN 60	Omega Nebula		M17, Swan Nebula, Sharpless 45, RCW 160, Gum 81
LBN 67	Eagle Nebula		M16, NGC 6611, Sharpless 49, RCW 165, Cr 375, Gum 83, Star Queen Nebula
LBN 135			NGC 6820, Sh 2-86
LBN 168	Tulip Nebula		Sh 2-101
LBN 179	West Veil Nebula		Caldwell 34, NGC 6960, Witch's Broom, Lacework Nebula, Filamentary Nebula
LBN 203	Crescent Nebula		NGC 6888, Sharpless 105, Caldwell 27
LBN 373	North American Nebula		NGC 7000, Sharpless 117, Caldwell 20
LBN 424	Cocoon Nebula		IC 5146, Caldwell 19, Sh 2-125, Barnard 168, Collinder 470
LBN 487	Iris Nebula		NGC 7023, Caldwell 4
LBN 497			NGC 7129
LBN 511	Wizard Nebula		NGC 7380, Sh 2-142
LBN 616	Pacman Nebula		IC 11, Sh 2-184, NGC 281
LBN 620			IC 59
LBN 622	Ghost of Cassiopeia		IC 63
LBN 623			Sh 2-185 (contains IC 59 and IC 63)
LBN 645	Fish Head Nebula		IC 1795, NGC 896, Northern Bear Nebula
LBN 704	Fossil Footprint Nebula		NGC 1491, Sh 2-206
LBN 722	Little Cocoon Nebula		NGC 1624
LBN 756	California Nebula		NGC 1499, Sharpless 220
LBN 771	Maia Nebula		
LBN 795	Flaming Star Nebula		SH 2-229, Caldwell 31
LBN 833	Crab Nebula		M 1, NGC 1592, Taurus A, Sh 2-244
LBN 920	Hubble's Variable Nebula		NGC 2261, Caldwell 46
LBN 948	Rosette Nebula		SH 2-275, CTB 21, Caldwell 49
LBN 953	Flame Nebula		NGC 2024, Sh 2-277
LBN 974	Orion Nebula		M42, NGC 1976
LBN 1041	Thor's Helmet		NGC 2359, Gum 4, RCW 5

== See also ==
- LBN 114.55+00.22

== Sources ==
- https://in-the-sky.org/data/catalogue.php?cat=LBN
