= Glass with embedded metal and sulfides =

Tiny spheroids in cosmic dust particles

Glass with embedded metal and sulfides (GEMS) are tiny spheroids in cosmic dust particles with bulk compositions that are approximately chondritic. They form the building blocks of anhydrous interplanetary dust particles (IDPs) in general, and cometary IDPs, in particular. Their compositions, mineralogy and petrography appear to have been shaped by exposure to ionizing radiation. Since the exposure occurred prior to the accretion of cometary IDPs, and therefore comets themselves, GEMS are likely either solar nebula or presolar interstellar grains. The properties of GEMS (size, shape, mineralogy) bear a strong resemblance to those of interstellar silicate grains as inferred from astronomical observations. (Note: Bradley and Ireland, 1996)
