= Sh 2-185 =

H II region in the constellation Cassiopeia

Emission nebula
- H II region
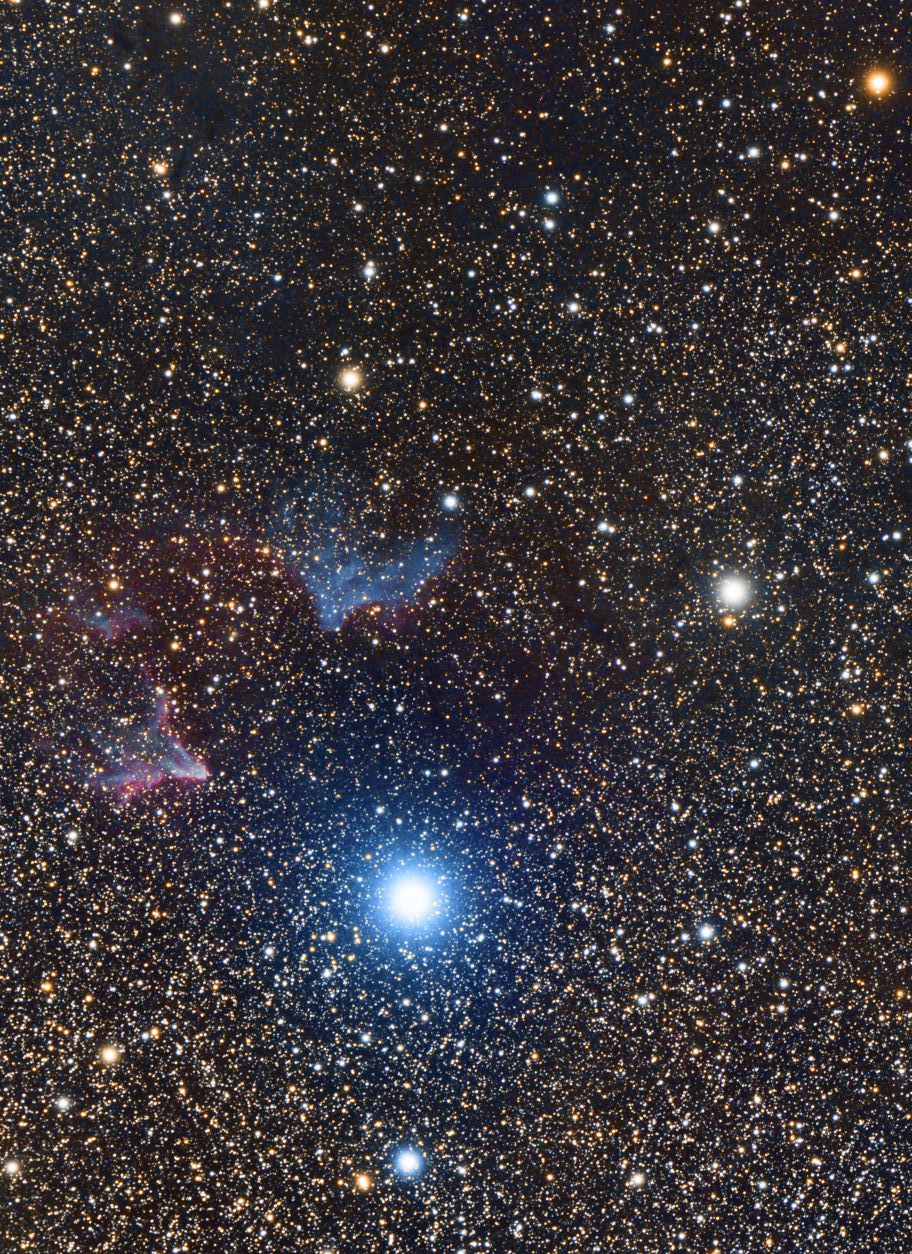
- The brightest star is Gamma Cassiopeiae. The blue IC 59 nebula is positioned above the star and the redder IC 63 is to the left.

Observation data: J2000 epoch
- Right ascension: 01^{h} 00^{m} 00^{s}
- Declination: +60° 59′
- Distance: 10,500 ± 2,100 ly
- Apparent dimensions (V): 2°
- Constellation: Cassiopeia
- Designations: LBN 623

Sh 2-185, or LBN 623, is an H II region centered on the massive star system Gamma Cassiopeiae (γ Cas) in the northern constellation of Cassiopeia. It was included in the second Catalogue of H II Regions, published in 1959 by Stewart Sharpless, and in Lynds' Catalogue of Bright Nebulae. Sh 2-185 is located at a distance of approximately 10,500 ly (3.23 kpc) from the Sun. The region is surrounded by a dust shell, and displays several infrared point sources that are a characteristics of young stellar objects.

This H II region includes the reflection and emission nebulae IC 59 and IC 63. Both nebulae have a cometary shape, with IC 63 being the brighter of the two. The difference in appearance between the two nebulae is a consequence of their physical distance from γ Cas. IC 63 displays a well-defined ionization front, while this is lacking in IC 59. The nebulae are the closest photodissociation regions to the Sun.

== IC 59 ==
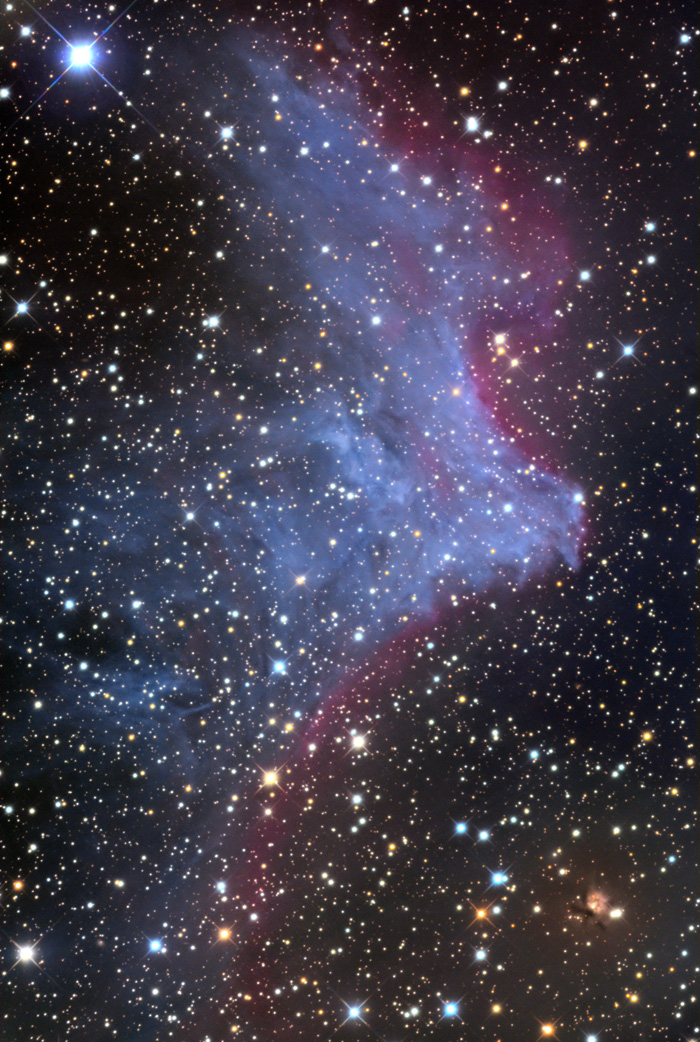
IC 59 imaged by the 32 inch Schulman telescope at Mount Lemmon Observatory.

IC 59 (or LBN 620) was discovered by German astronomer Max Wolf on December 30, 1893, then added to J. L. E. Dreyer's Index Catalogue of Nebulae in 1895. It spans an angular size of 10′ and is visible with a small telescope. From the perspective of the Earth, IC 59 is positioned in front of γ Cas, and the closest tip to the star is located at a separation of 13.5 ly (4.15 pc). It is a photodissociation region that is being sculpted by γ Cas. Light from the star is being scattered from the nebula at an angle of 17° toward the Earth.

Although the tip of the nebula has been considered the closest point to γ Cas, the western concave face is where the most intense UV radiation is being received. Hence the tip may actually be further away from the star than the rest of the cloud. The warmer component of this nebula has a mean temperature of 675±49 K, while the cooler component is 150±34 K.

== IC 63 ==
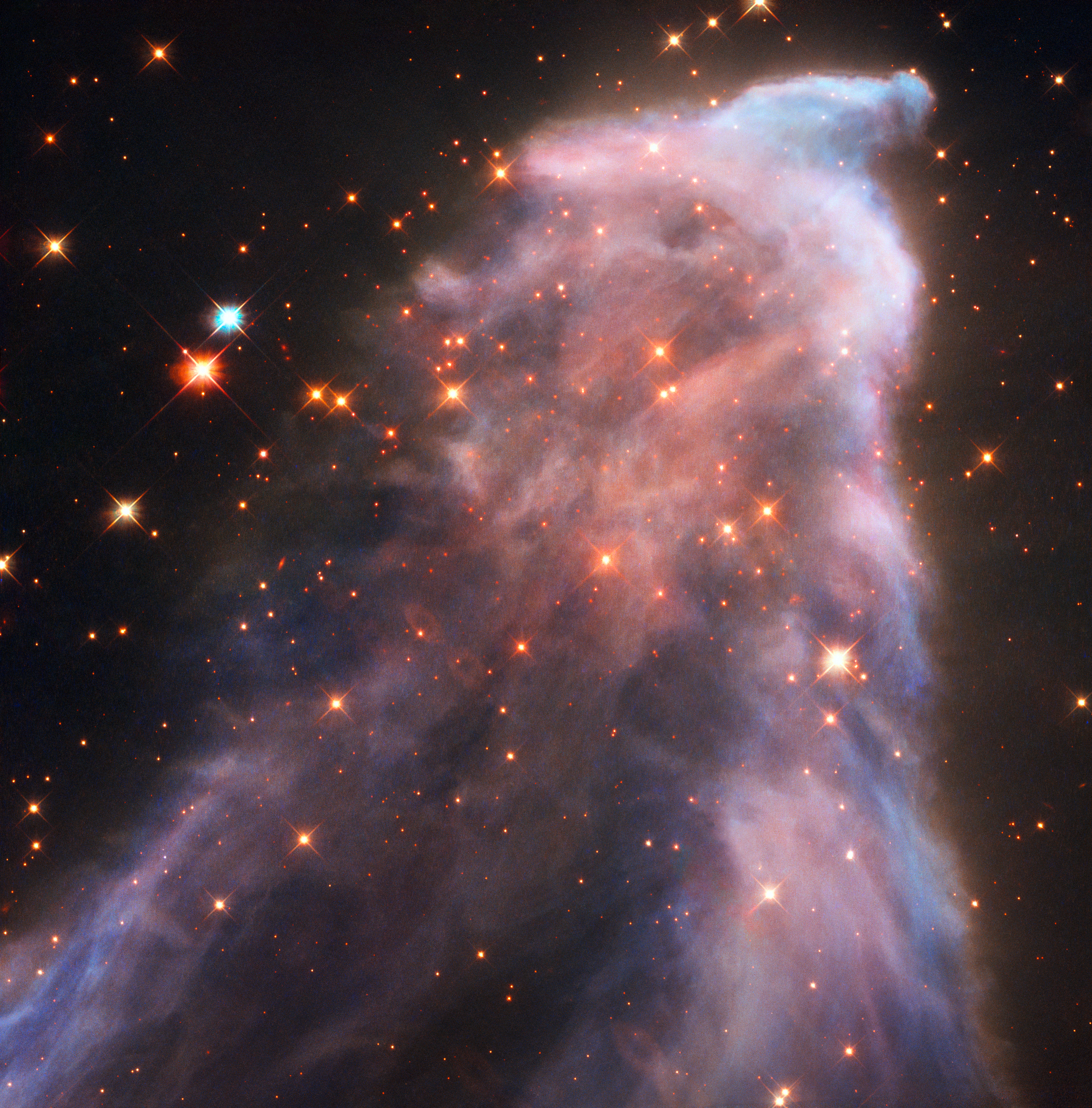
The tip of IC 63 imaged by the Hubble Space Telescope.

IC 63 (or LBN 622) is sometimes dubbed the Ghost Nebula, or the Ghost of Cassiopeia. It was discovered by Max Wolf on the same night as IC 59, and has since been extensively studied. It spans an angular size of 10′ and is visible with a small telescope. From the perspective of the Earth, IC 63 is positioned behind γ Cas, and the closest tip to the star is located at a separation of 7.5 ly (2.3 pc). It is a photodissociation region that is being sculpted by γ Cas. Light from the star is being scattered from the nebula at an angle of 154° toward the Earth.

Amateur false color image of IC 63. Broadband near infrared emission is red, singly ionized sulfur is green, and ionized hydrogen is blue.

There is no evidence of triggered star formation in this nebula. The warmer component of this nebula has a mean temperature of 740±47 K, while the cooler component is 207±30 K. The velocity distribution across the nebula varies with the distance from the star, and is consistent with it being driven by the radiation. The atomic hydrogen in the PDR structure has a clumpy organization, while the tip has a ring-like structure. The entire structure seems to be moving apart and it is likely that this nebula will completely disperse within a half million years.
