= Beverly Turner Lynds =

American astronomer (1929–2024)

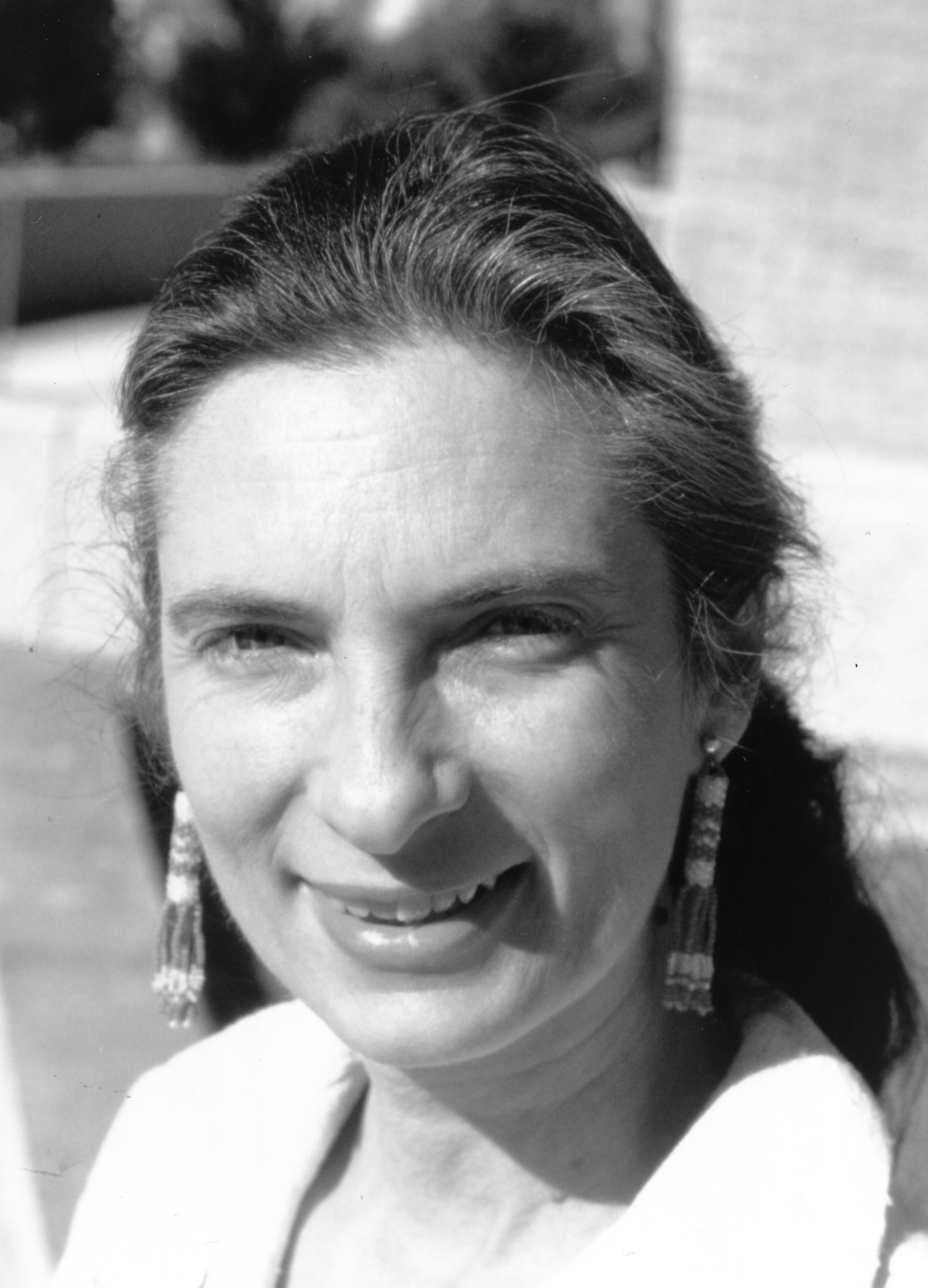
- Lynds in 1973
- Born: Beverly Ann Turner; August 19, 1929; Shreveport, Louisiana, U.S.
- Died: October 5, 2024 (aged 95); Portland, Oregon, U.S.
- Occupation: Astronomer
- Known for: Lynds' Catalogue of Bright Nebulae; Lynds' Catalogue of Dark Nebulae
- Spouses: Clarence Roger Lynds (m. 1954; div. 1986) Leo Goldberg (m. 1987; died 1987)
- Children: 1

Academic background
- Education: University of California, Berkeley
- Academic advisor: Otto Struve

Academic work
- Discipline: Astronomy
- Sub-discipline: Nebular science
- Institutions: University of Arizona; Kitt Peak National Observatory
- Main interests: Nebulae
- Notable works: Elementary Astronomy (1959)

Beverly Turner Lynds (August 19, 1929 – October 5, 2024) was an American astronomer. She was best known for compiling two astronomical catalogues in the 1960s, Lynds' Catalogue of Bright Nebulae and Lynds' Catalogue of Dark Nebulae.

== Early life and education ==
Lynds was born Beverly Ann Turner in Shreveport, Louisiana, on August 19, 1929. She graduated with a Ph.D. from the University of California, Berkeley in 1955.

== Career ==
Lynds was a research associate at the University of California, Berkeley from 1955 to 1958, and then a research associate at the National Radio Astronomy Observatory in Green Bank, West Virginia, from 1959 to 1960. She became Assistant Professor of Astronomy at the University of Arizona from 1961 to 1965, and Associate Professor of Astronomy at the same university from 1965 to 1971. From 1971 to 1986, Lynds was an astronomer at Kitt Peak National Observatory. She served as a consultant for the Association of Universities for Research in Astronomy from 1986 to 1987.

Lynds worked as an associate of the Center for Astrophysics and Space Astronomy at the University of Colorado, Boulder since 1987, and also served as the Sky Math liaison for the Unidata program at the University Corporation for Atmospheric Research since 1991.

== Personal life and death ==
On June 19, 1954, she married fellow University of California, Berkeley astronomy graduate student Clarence Roger Lynds. The couple divorced in September 1986. Beverly Lynds then married astronomer Leo Goldberg on January 2, 1987. Goldberg died less than a year later in November 1987. Lynds had one daughter, named Susan Elizabeth.

Lynds died in Portland, Oregon, on October 5, 2024, at the age of 95.

== Publications ==
In 1959, Lynds published the textbook Elementary Astronomy, co-authored with Otto Struve and Helen Pillans.

Her works include Dark Nebulae, Globules, and Protostars (1987) and numerous papers.

== Professional affiliations ==
Lynds' professional affiliations include:

- American Association for the Advancement of Science (chairman of the section D)
- International Astronomical Union
- American Astronomical Society (councillor)
- National Council of Teachers of Mathematics
- American Indian Science and Engineering Society
