= NGC 7129 =

Reflection nebula in the constellation Cepheus

Reflection nebula
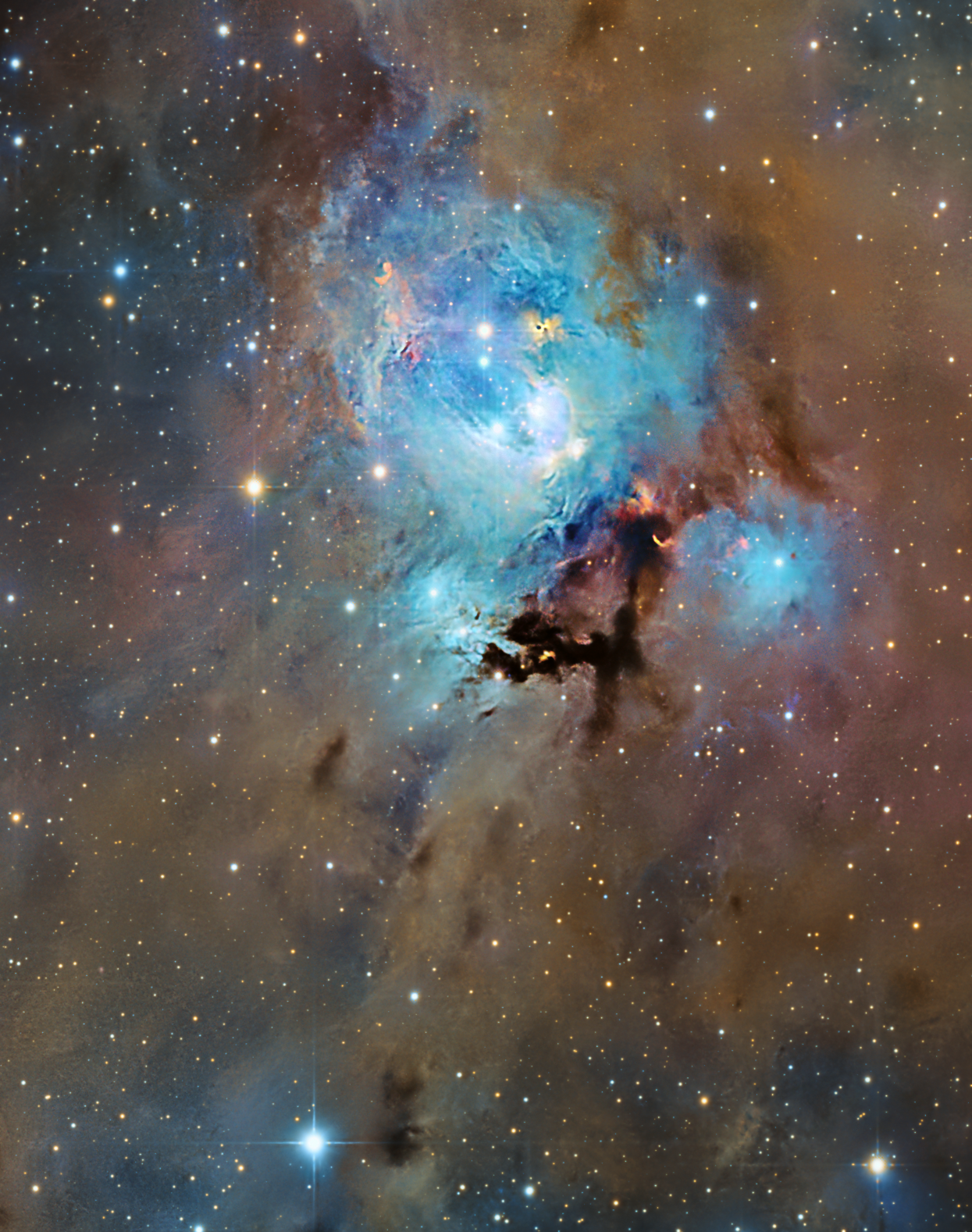
- NGC 7129, also called the Flower Bud Nebula, surrounded by dark nebulosity.

Observation data: J2000.0 epoch
- Right ascension: 21^{h} 42^{m} 56^{s}
- Declination: +66° 6′ 12″
- Distance: 3,300 ly (1,010 pc)
- Apparent magnitude (V): 11.5
- Apparent dimensions (V): 7′ x 7′
- Constellation: Cepheus

Physical characteristics
- Radius: 3 ly
- Designations: Cr 441, OCL 240, LBN 497

NGC 7129, also known as the Small Cluster Nebula, Cosmic Rosebud Nebula, or the Flower Bud Nebula, is a reflection nebula located 3,300 light years away in the constellation Cepheus. A young open cluster is responsible for illuminating the surrounding nebula. A recent survey indicates the cluster contains more than 130 stars less than 1 million years old. NGC 7129 is located just half a degree from nearby cluster NGC 7142.

The nebula is rosebud-shaped; the young stars have blown a large, oddly shaped bubble in the molecular cloud that once surrounded them at their birth. The rosy pink color comes from glowing dust grains on the surface of the bubble being heated by the intense light from the young stars within. The ultra-violet and visible light produced by the young stars is absorbed by the surrounding dust grains. They are heated by this process and release the energy at longer infrared wavelengths as photographed by the Spitzer Space Telescope. The reddish colors in the false-colour infrared image suggest the distribution of hydrocarbon rich molecular material.

The much cooler molecular cloud outside the bubble is mostly invisible to Spitzer. However, three very young stars near the center of the nebula are sending jets of supersonic gas into the cloud. The collision of these jets heats carbon monoxide molecules in the nebula. This produces the complex nebulosity that appears like a stem of a rosebud.

== Gallery ==
NGC 7129 imaged by the James Webb Space Telescope

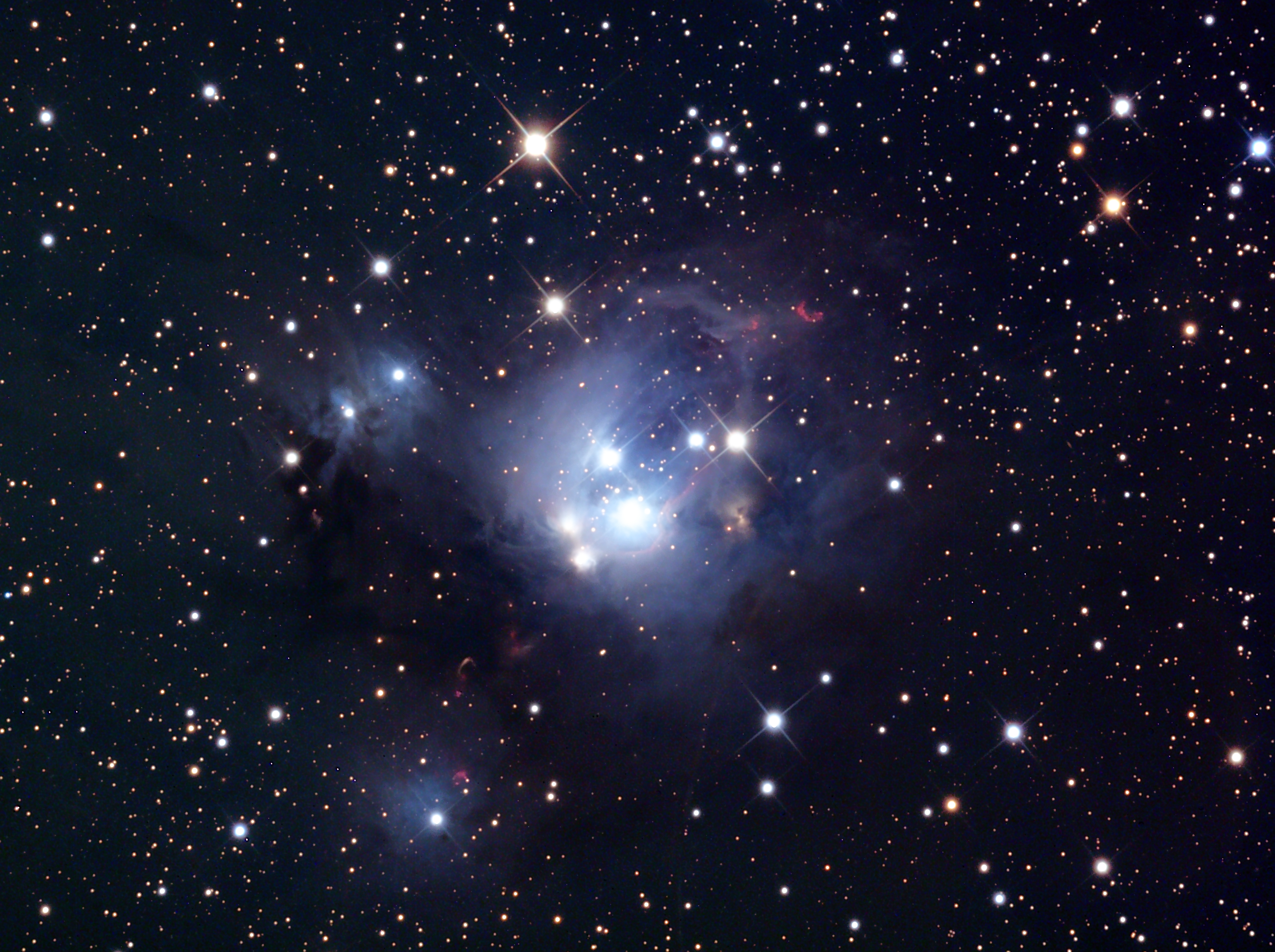
NGC 7129 as imaged through a 24-inch telescope on Mt. Lemmon

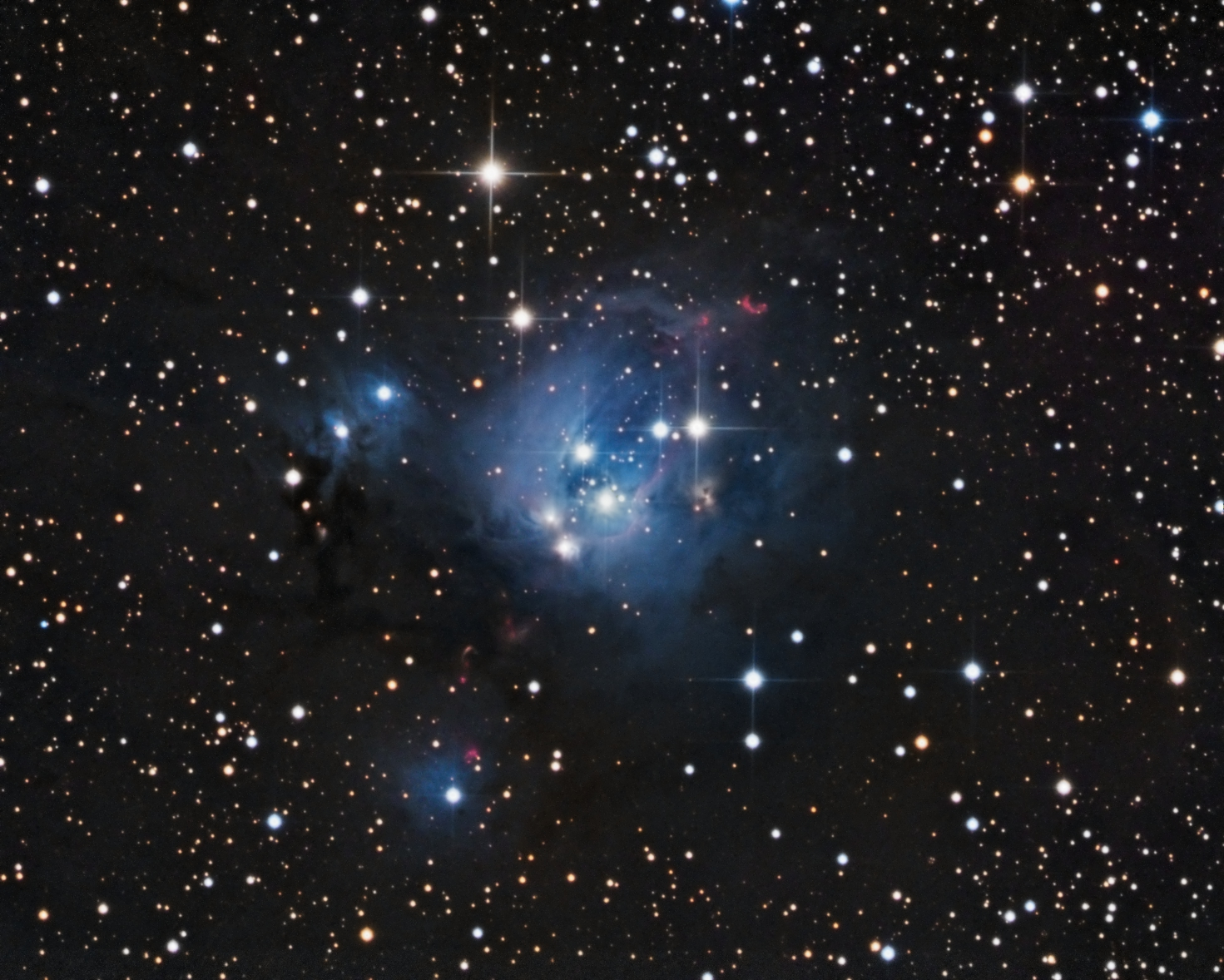
Astro image of NGC7129 imaged with a 12.5 inch CDK from Talent, OR

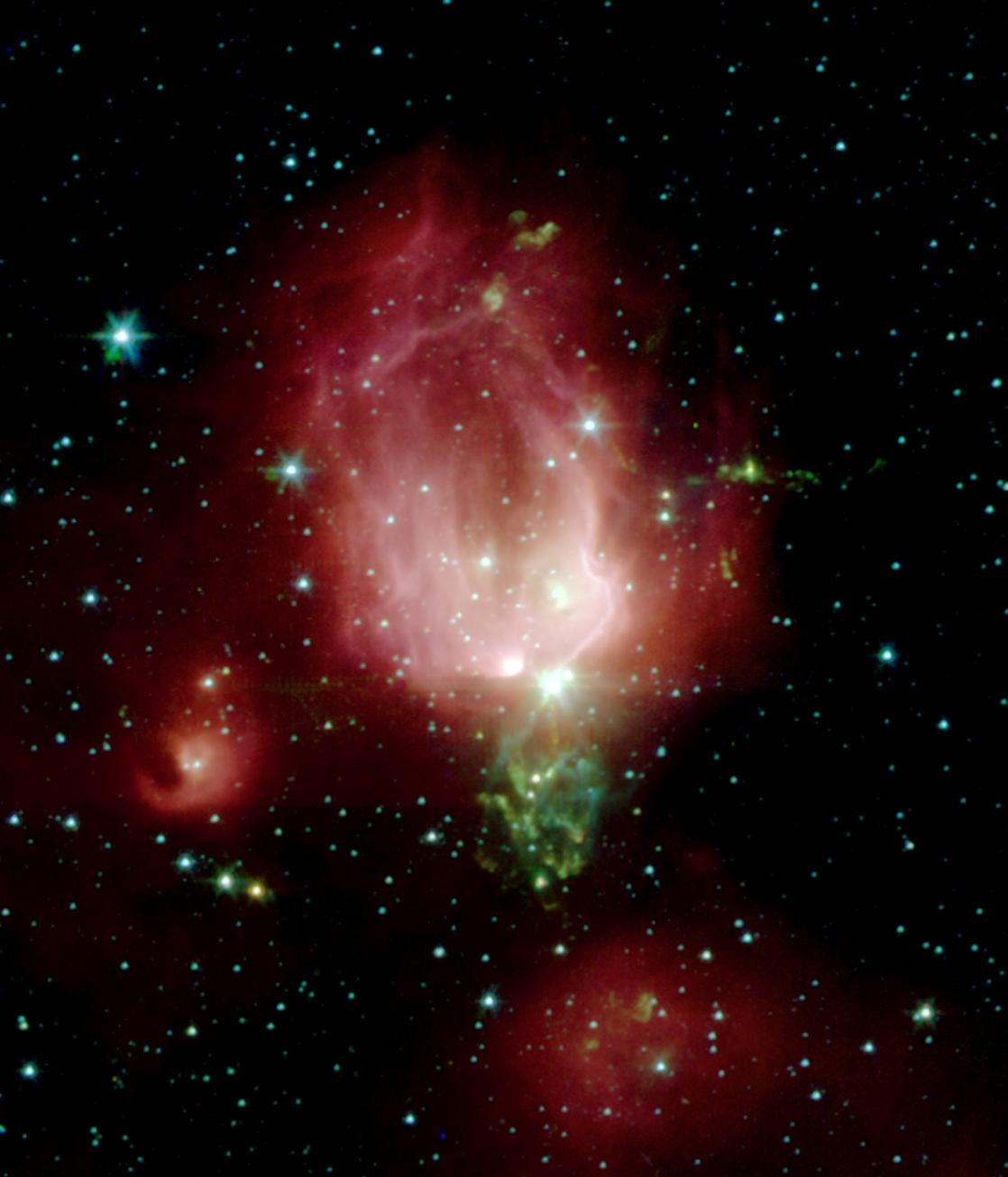
An image of NGC 7129 by the Spitzer Space Telescope
