= Jerome D. Schein =

American academic (1923–2010)

- Born: Jerome Daniel Schein; May 27, 1923; Minneapolis, Minnesota
- Died: April 16, 2010 (aged 86); Pompano Beach, Florida
- Spouse(s): Amy Ann Butt, Enid G. Wolf

Jerome D. Schein was professor of sensory rehabilitation at New York University, and adjunct professor of education at the University of Alberta, Canada, and a consultant in Coconut Creek, Florida.

== Personal life and ancestry ==
Jerome Daniel Schein was born on May 22, 1923, to Adolph and Jeanette Schein, who were both from Romania. Adolph was born in Galatz, Romania, and Jeanette was born in Focșani, Romania. He was the younger brother to Harold and Donald. Schein was born in Minneapolis where he stayed for the majority of his adult life. He attended North Community High School where he was a part of the science club. He was a member of the National Honor Society. At NHS, he met Amy Ann Butt, and she became pregnant with his child in March 1942. His daughter, Carole Dianne Schein was born on December 7, 1942. He attended Northwestern University, and on June 27, 1942, he registered for World War II. His other daughter, Raleigh Helene Schein, was born on January 17, 1947.

== Career ==
Schein was a professor of Sensory Rehabilitation at New York University. He was also a professor at Gallaudet University, and an adjust professor at the University of Alberta. He published 25 books and more than 200 refereed papers on sensory disorders and has received numerous honors and awards. He was a member of the Journal of Rehabilitation Research and Development. He was the author of over 200 papers and a holder of the Powrie V. Doctor Chair at Gallaudet.
