= LBN 114.55+00.22 =

Emission nebula

Emission nebula
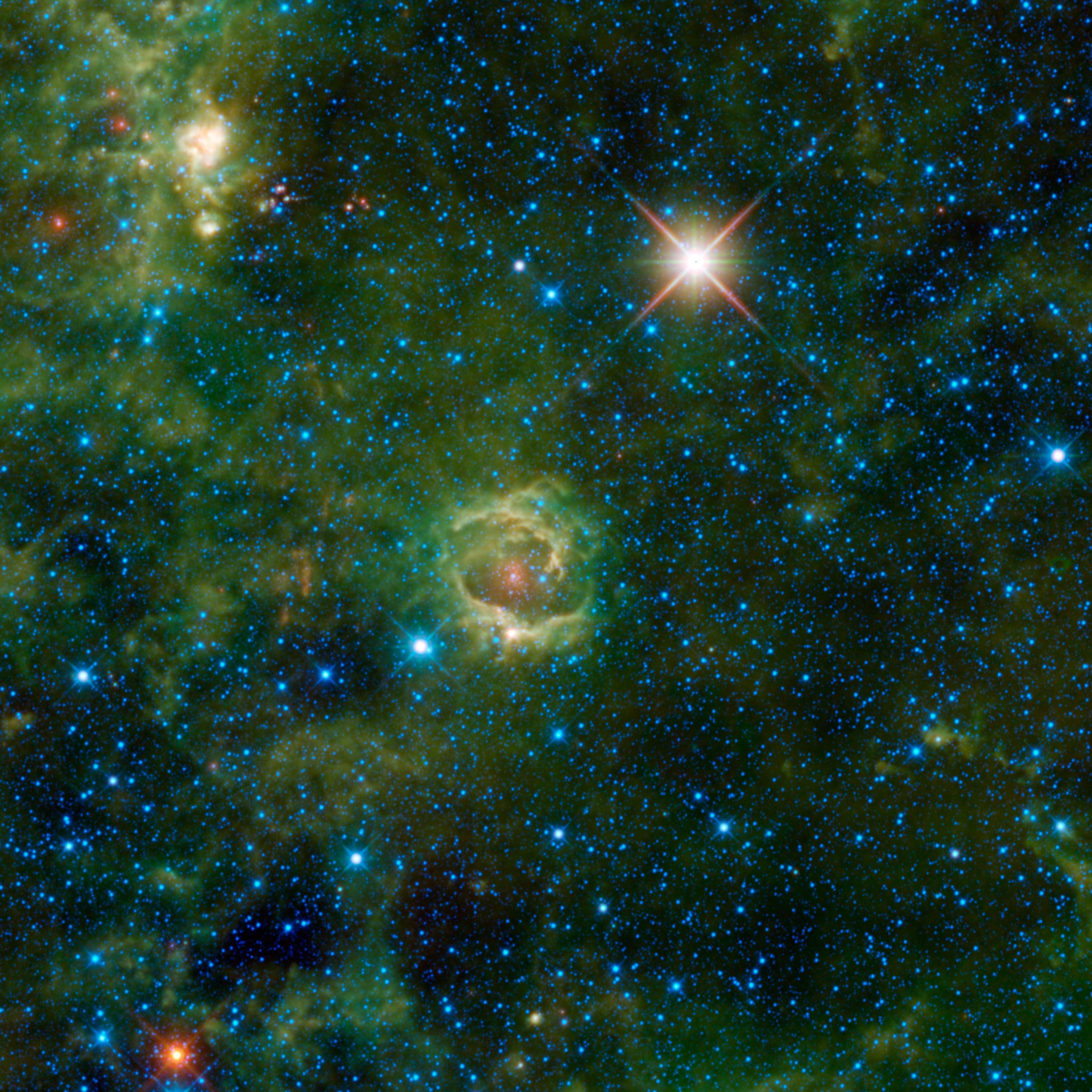

Observation data: J2000.0 epoch
- Right ascension: 23^{h} 39^{m} 18.0^{s}
- Declination: +61° 56′ 00″
- Distance: 1.9 kpc ly
- Constellation: Cassiopeia

Physical characteristics
- Radius: 15 light years ly

LBN 114.55+00.22 is an emission nebula in the constellation Cassiopeia. Named after the astronomer who published a catalogue of nebulae in 1965, LBN stands for “Lynds Bright Nebula." The numbers 114.55+00.22 refer to nebula's coordinates in the Milky Way Galaxy. Dust blocks most of the visible light from this nebula.
