= Photodissociation region =

Gaseous parts of the interstellar medium which are heated by UV photons

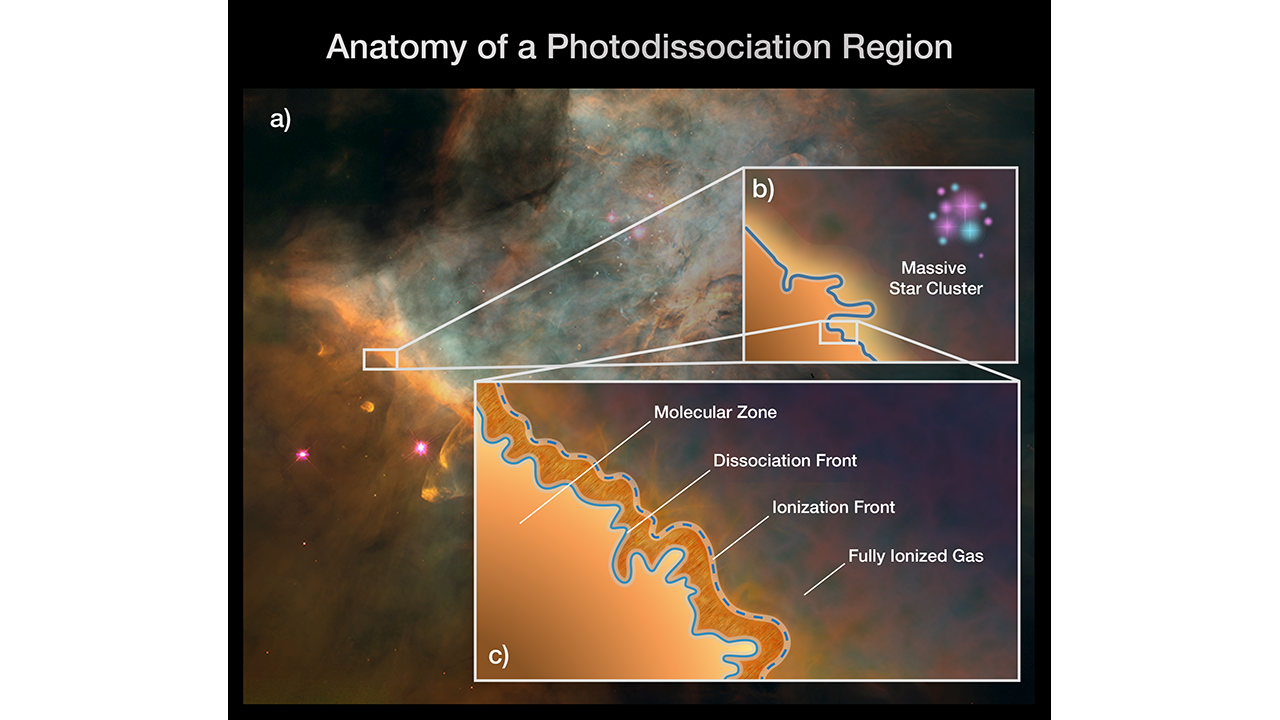
The image shows the 4 primary zones of a photodissociation region: the molecular zone, the dissociation front, the ionization front, and the fully ionized flow of gas.

In astrophysics, photodissociation regions (or photon-dominated regions, PDRs) are predominantly neutral regions of the interstellar medium in which far ultraviolet photons strongly influence the gas chemistry and act as the most important source of heat. They constitute a sort of shell around sources of far-UV photons at a distance where the interstellar gas is dense enough, and the flux from the photon source is no longer strong enough, to strip electrons from the neutral constituent atoms. Despite being composed of denser gas, PDRs still have too low a column density to prevent the penetration of far-UV photons from distant, massive stars. PDRs are also composed of a cold molecular zone that has the potential for star formation. They achieve this cooling by far-infrared fine line emissions of neutral oxygen and ionized carbon. It is theorized that PDRs are able to maintain their shape by trapped magnetic fields originating from the far-UV source. A typical and well-studied example is the gas at the boundary of a giant molecular cloud. PDRs are also associated with HII regions, reflection nebulae, active galactic nuclei, and Planetary nebulae. All of a galaxy's atomic gas and most of its molecular gas is found in PDRs.

The closest PDRs to the Sun are IC 59 and IC 63, near the bright Be star Gamma Cassiopeiae.

== History ==
The study of photodissociation regions began from early observations of the star-forming regions Orion A and M17 which showed neutral areas bright in infrared radiation lying outside ionised HII regions.
