= HH 24-26 =

High-density star formation and molecular cloud

Molecular cloud
- Herbig-Haro object
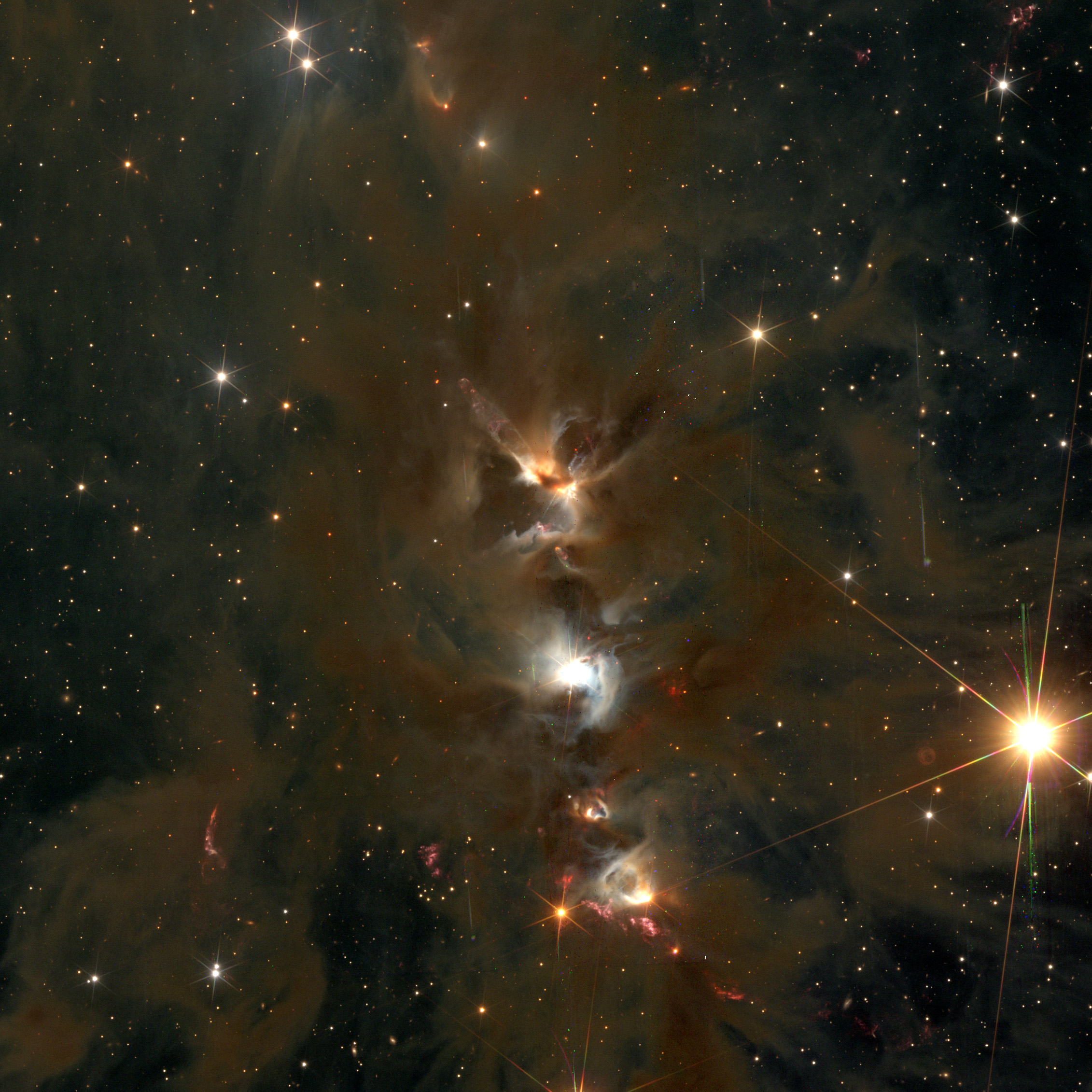
- McNeil's Nebula (top) HH 24 (middle), HBC 502 (blue star in the middle), HH 25 (below the blue star), HH 26 (red clouds at the bottom) and HH 27 (red cloud at the bottom left)

Observation data: J2000.0 epoch
- Right ascension: 05^{h} 46^{m} 07.34^{s}
- Declination: −00° 13′ 31.3″
- Distance: 1300 ly
- Constellation: Orion
- Designations: HH 24, HH 25, HH 26, JCMTSF J054607.3-001333, HH 24/26, HH 24-26, HH 24-27

HH 24-26 is a molecular cloud and star-forming region containing the Herbig-Haro objects HH 24, HH 25 and HH 26. This region contains the highest concentration of astrophysical jets known anywhere in the sky. The molecular cloud is located about 1400 light-years away in the L1630 dark cloud, which is part of the Orion B molecular cloud in the constellation of Orion.

The region contains multiple protostars (two class 0 and one class I) and four more evolved IRAS sources. The three protostars are driving the Herbig-Haro objects in this region.

== Observation ==
The L1630 dark cloud also contains NGC 2071 and the Flame Nebula. HH 24-26 is located just a few arcminutes south of Messier 78.

== HH 24 ==
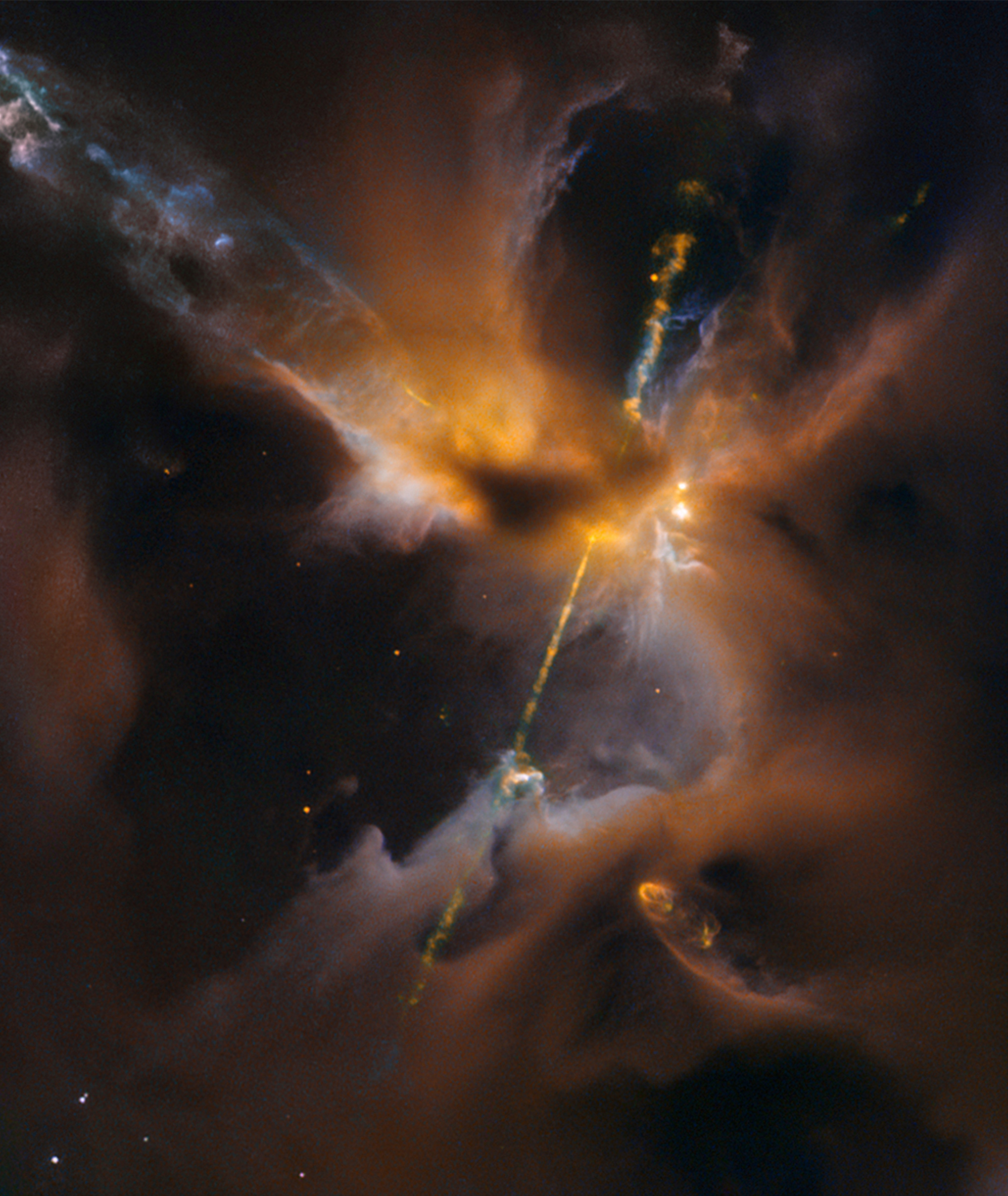
An image of HH 24 taken by the Hubble Space Telescope

The image of HH 24 taken by the Hubble Space Telescope is probably the most well known image of this Herbig-Haro object. HH 24 resembles a lightsaber from the science fiction movies Star Wars and the Hubble image was published during the release of Star Wars Episode VII: The Force Awakens.

HH 24 contains a class 0 protostar, which might be a proto-binary system. The disks around these objects are highly misaligned, which is a sign of turbulent fragmentation.

== See also ==
- Astronomy Picture of the Day
