= NGC 2067 =

Reflection nebula in the constellation Orion

Reflection nebula
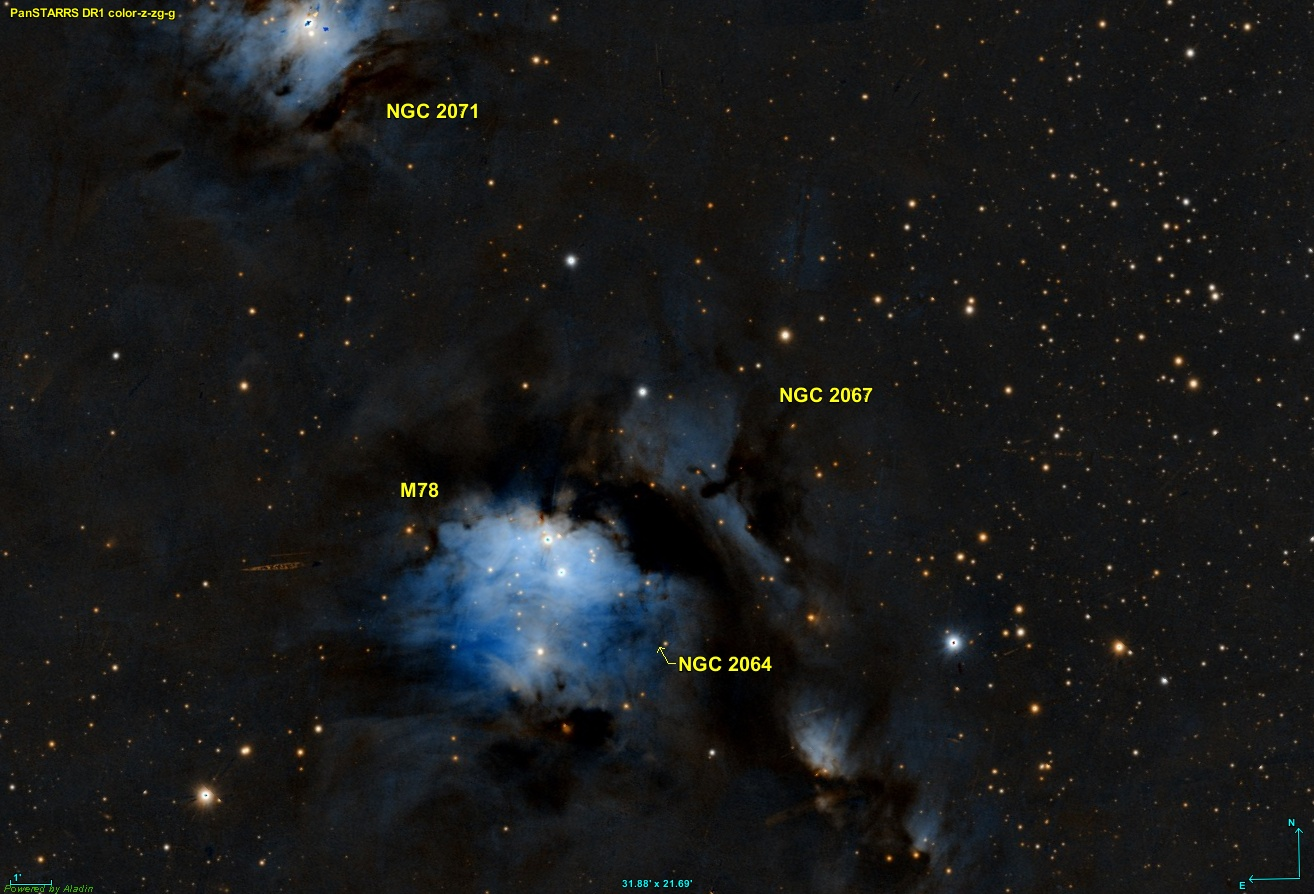

Observation data: J2000.0 epoch
- Right ascension: 05^{h} 46^{m} 31.9^{s}
- Declination: 00° 07′ 52″
- Apparent dimensions (V): 8.0' x 3.0'
- Constellation: Orion
- Designations: DG 79

NGC 2067 is a reflection nebula in the constellation Orion. It was discovered in 1876 by Wilhelm Tempel. It is part of a group of nebulae that also includes Messier 78, NGC 2071 and NGC 2064.
