= NGC 2064 =

Reflection nebula in the constellation Orion

Reflection nebula
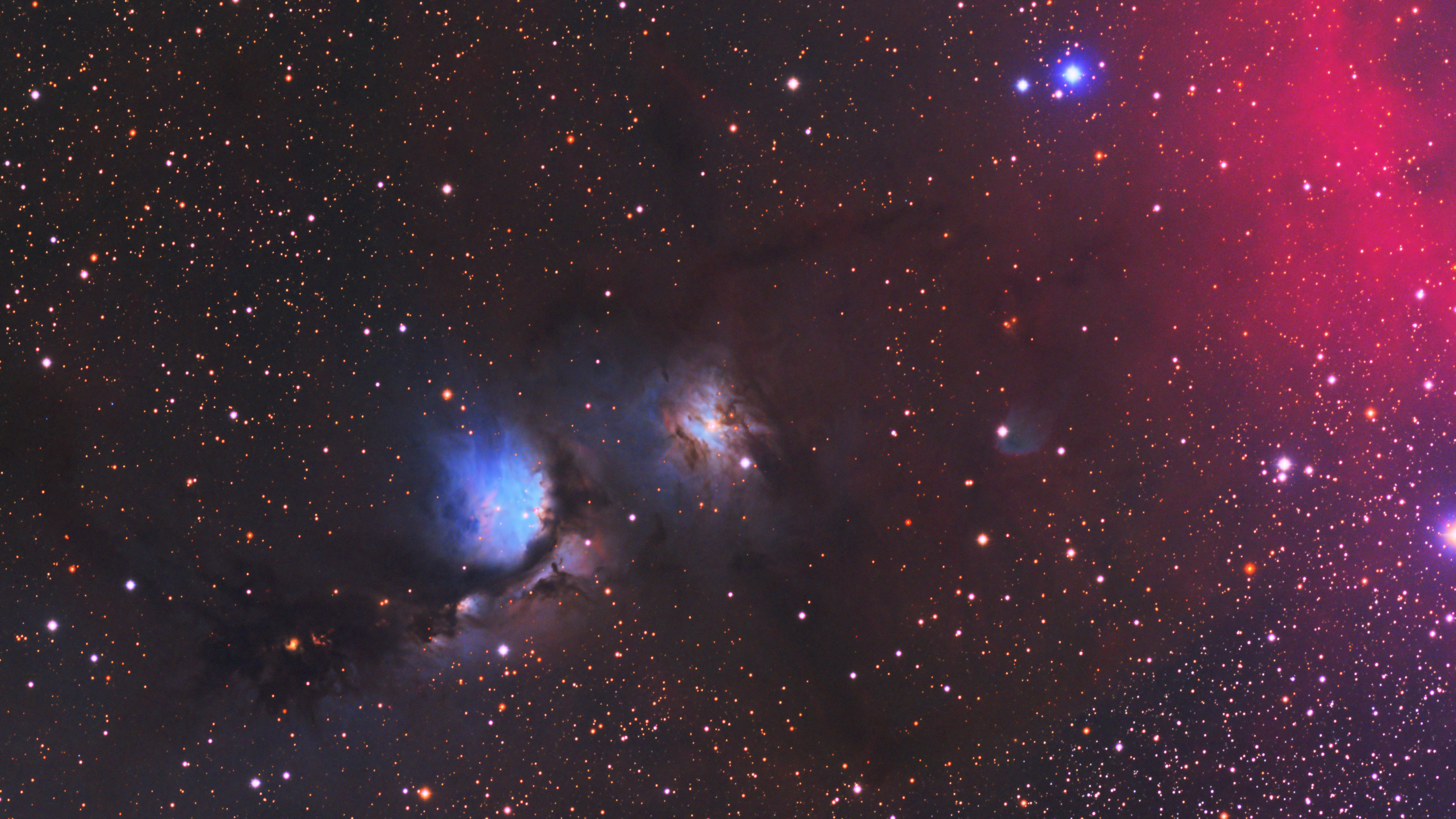
- NGC 2064

Observation data: J2000.0 epoch
- Right ascension: 05^{h} 46^{m} 18.4^{s}
- Declination: 00° 00′ 21″
- Apparent magnitude (V): 8.2
- Apparent dimensions (V): 1.0' x 1.0'
- Constellation: Orion
- Designations: LBN 1627

NGC 2064 (also designated as LBN 1627) is a reflection nebula that is located 1600 light years away from earth in the constellation Orion. It was discovered on January 11, 1864, by Heinrich d'Arrest. It is part of a group of nebulae that includes Messier 78, NGC 2071 and NGC 2067. Objects that appear close to NGC 2064 from our perspective include the Spirograph nebula, Horsehead nebula, Flame nebula, Rosette nebula and the Orion nebula. This object has a magnitude of 8.2.
