= Euclid (space telescope) =

European visible and near-infrared space observatory, launched in 2023

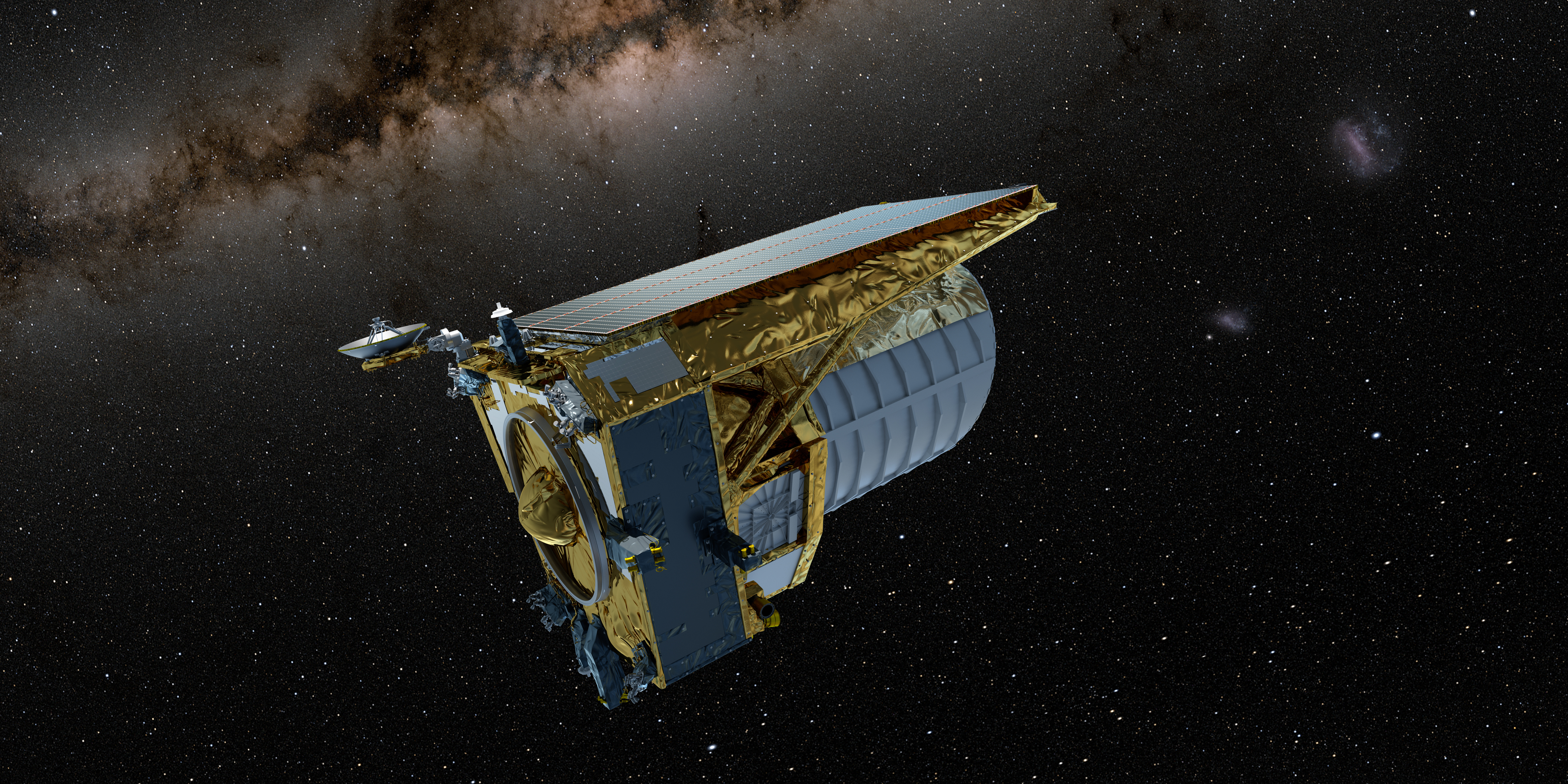
- Artist's impression
- Names: Dark Universe Explorer (DUNE); Spectroscopic All Sky Cosmic Explorer (SPACE)
- Mission type: Astronomy
- Operator: ESA
- COSPAR ID: 2023-092A
- SATCAT no.: 57209
- Website: ESA – Euclid euclid-ec.org
- Mission duration: 6 years (nominal); 3 years, 4 months and 18 days (in progress)

Spacecraft properties
- Manufacturer: Thales Alenia Space (main); Airbus Defence and Space (payload module)
- Launch mass: 2,000 kg (4,400 lb)
- Payload mass: 800 kg (1,800 lb)
- Dimensions: 4.5 × 3.1 m (15 × 10 ft)

Start of mission
- Launch date: 1 July 2023, 15:12 UTC
- Rocket: Falcon 9
- Launch site: Cape Canaveral, SLC‑40
- Contractor: SpaceX

Orbital parameters
- Reference system: Sun–Earth L_{2}
- Regime: Lissajous orbit
- Periapsis altitude: 1,150,000 km (710,000 mi)
- Apoapsis altitude: 1,780,000 km (1,110,000 mi)
- Epoch: Planned

Main telescope
- Type: Korsch telescope
- Diameter: 1.2 m (3 ft 11 in)
- Focal length: 24.5 m (80 ft)
- Collecting area: 1.006 m^{2} (10.83 sq ft)
- Wavelengths: From 550 nm (green) to 2 μm (near-infrared)
- Resolution: 0.1 arcsec (visible); 0.3 arcsec (near-infrared)

Transponders
- Band: X band (TT&C support); K band (data acquisition)
- Frequency: 8.0–8.4 GHz (X band); 25.5–27 GHz (K band)
- Bandwidth: Few kbit/s down & up (X band); 74 Mbit/s (K band)
Instruments
- VIS: VISible imager
- NISP: Near Infrared Spectrometer and Photometer
- ESA insignia Cosmic Vision (Science Programme)

Euclid is a wide-angle space telescope with a 600-megapixel camera to record visible light, a near-infrared spectrometer, and photometer, to determine the redshift of detected galaxies. It was developed by the European Space Agency (ESA) and the Euclid Consortium and was launched on 1 July 2023 from Cape Canaveral in Florida. The mission is named after the ancient Greek mathematician Euclid.

After approximately one month, it reached its destination, a halo orbit around the Sun-Earth second Lagrange point L2, at an average distance of 1.5 million kilometres beyond Earth's orbit. There the telescope is to remain operational for at least six years. The objective of the Euclid mission is to better understand dark energy and dark matter by accurately measuring the accelerating expansion of the universe. The Korsch-type telescope is measuring the shapes of galaxies at varying distances from Earth and investigates the relationship between distance and redshift.

Euclid is a medium-class ("M-class") mission and is part of the Cosmic Vision campaign of ESA's Science Programme. Euclid was chosen in October 2011 together with Solar Orbiter. Euclid was launched by a Falcon 9 rocket. On 7 November 2023 ESA revealed Euclid's first full-colour images of the cosmos, which illustrate Euclid's potential to create the most extensive 3D map of the universe. In May 2024, ESA's Euclid mission released images of galaxy clusters Abell 2390 and Abell 2764, star-forming region Messier 78, spiral galaxy NGC 6744, and the Dorado group of galaxies.

== Scientific objectives and methods ==
Euclid probes the history of the expansion of the universe and the formation of cosmic structures by measuring the redshift of galaxies out to a redshift value of 2, which is equivalent to seeing 10 billion years into the past. The link between galactic shapes and their corresponding redshift will help to show how dark energy contributes to the increased acceleration of the universe. The methods employed exploit the phenomenon of gravitational lensing, measurement of baryon acoustic oscillations, and measurement of galactic distances by spectroscopy.

Gravitational lensing (or gravitational shear) is the alteration of the trajectories of light rays caused by the presence of matter that locally modifies the curvature of space-time: light emitted by galaxies is deflected as it passes close to matter lying along the line of sight, distorting the resulting image. This matter is composed partly of visible galaxies but is theorized to be mostly dark matter. By measuring this shear, the amount of dark matter can be inferred, furthering the understanding of how it is distributed in the universe.

Spectroscopic measurements will permit measuring the redshifts of galaxies and determining their distances using Hubble's law. In this way, one can reconstruct the three-dimensional distribution of galaxies in the universe.

From these data, it is possible to simultaneously measure the statistical properties concerning the distribution of dark matter and galaxies and measure how these properties change as the spacecraft looks further back in time. Highly precise images are required to provide sufficiently accurate measurements. Any distortion inherent in the sensors must be accounted for and calibrated out, otherwise the resultant data would be of limited use.

== Mission overview ==
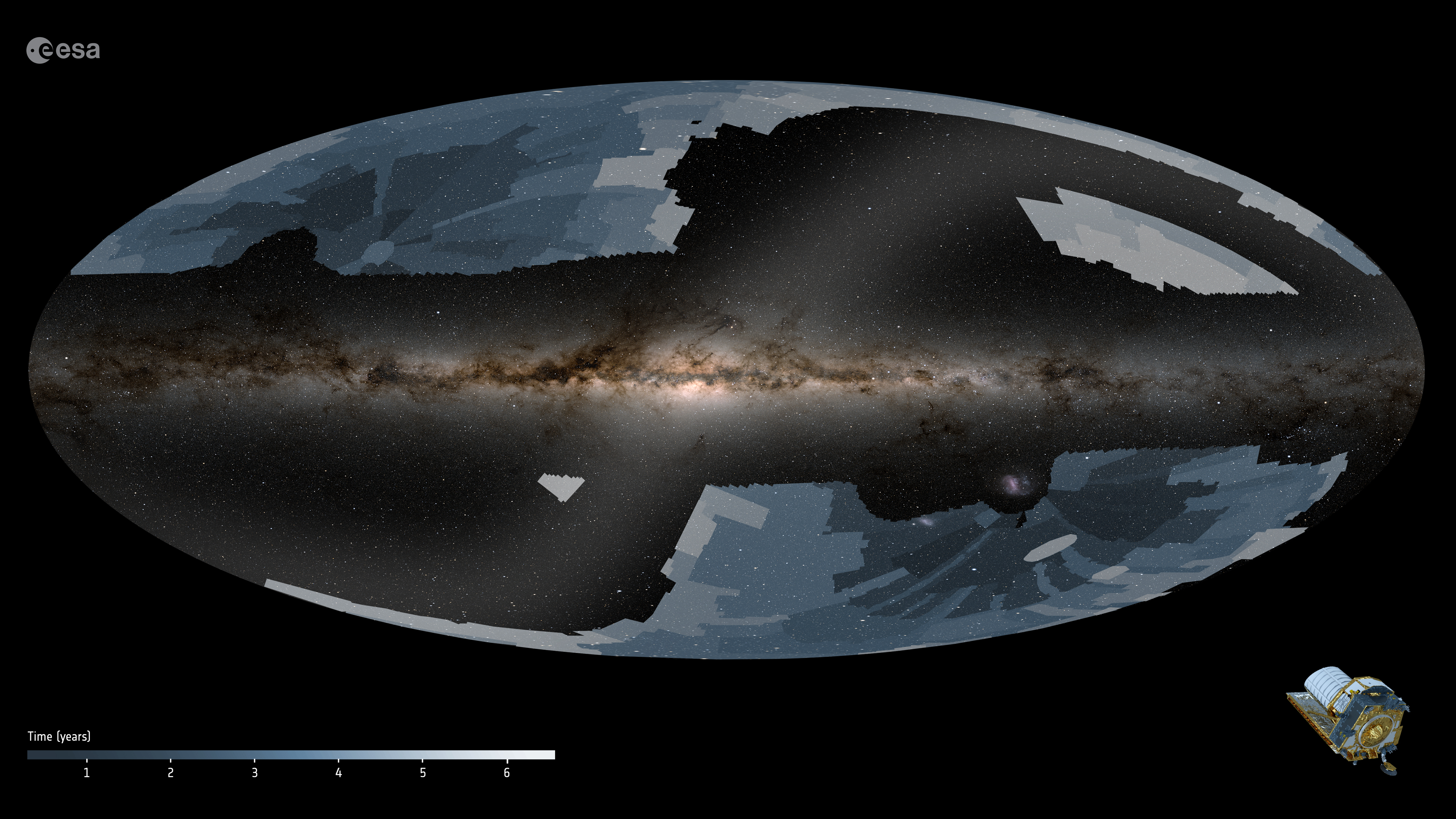
The areas Euclid will cover during its nominal six-year mission

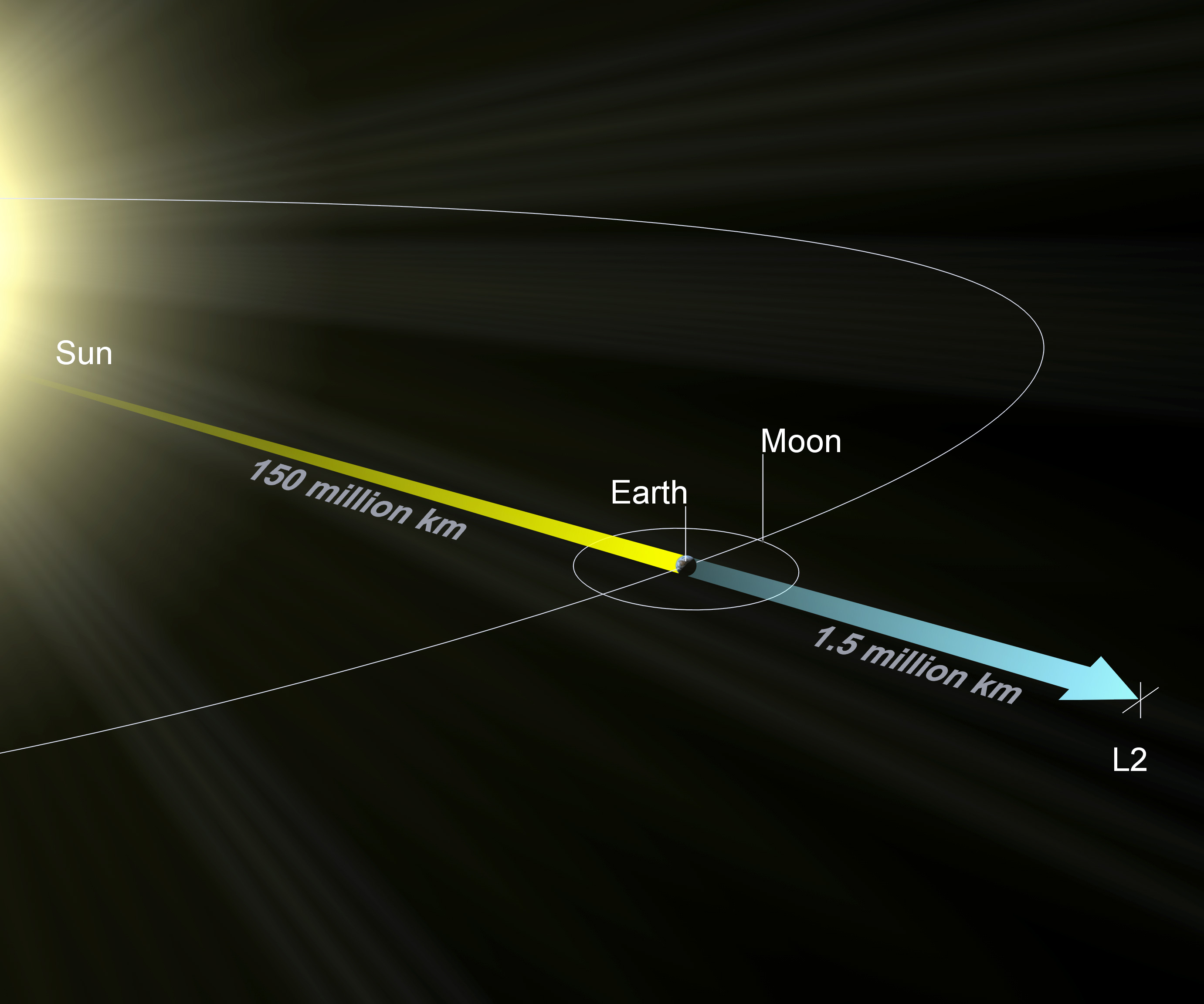
Euclid is orbiting the L_{2} Lagrange point

During its nominal mission, planned for at least six years, Euclid will observe about 15,000 deg^{2} (4.6 sr), about a third of the sky, focusing on the extragalactic sky (the sky facing away from the Milky Way). It will generate approximately 100 gigabytes of compressed data per day throughout its six-year mission. The survey will be complemented by additional observations of three deep fields to 5 times the signal-to-noise of the wide survey; the deep fields cover 50 deg^{2} (15.2 msr). The three fields will be regularly visited during the duration of the mission. They will be used as calibration fields and to monitor the telescope and instrument performance stability as well as to produce scientific data by observing the most distant galaxies and quasars in the universe. Two of the deep fields will overlap with deep fields of existing surveys and the third deep field is proposed as a location for one of the LSST deep drilling fields at the Vera C. Rubin Observatory.

To measure a photometric redshift for each galaxy with sufficient accuracy, the Euclid mission depends on additional photometric data obtained in at least four filters at optical wavelengths. This data will be obtained from ground-based telescopes located in northern and southern hemispheres to cover the full 15,000 deg^{2} of the mission. In total each galaxy of the Euclid mission will get photometric information in at least seven different filters covering the range 460–2000 nm.

About 10 billion astronomical sources will be observed by Euclid, of which one billion will be used for weak lensing (to have their gravitational shear measured) with a precision 50 times more accurate than was previously possible using ground-based telescopes. Euclid measures spectroscopic redshifts for at least 30 million objects to study galaxy clustering.

The scientific exploitation of this data set is carried out by a European-led consortium of more than 1200 people in over 100 laboratories in 18 countries (Austria, Belgium, Denmark, Finland, France, Germany, Italy, the Netherlands, Norway, Portugal, Romania, Spain, Switzerland, UK, Canada, US, and Japan). The Euclid Consortium is also responsible for the construction of the Euclid instrument payload and for the development and implementation of the Euclid ground segment which will process all data collected by the satellite.

The laboratories contributing to the Euclid Consortium are funded and supported by their national space agencies, which also have the programmatic responsibilities of their national contribution, and by their national research structures (research agencies, observatories, universities). Overall, the Euclid Consortium contribute about 25% of the total budget cost of the mission until completion.

The huge volume, diversity (space and ground, visible and near-infrared, morphometry, photometry, and spectroscopy) and the level of precision of measurements demanded considerable care and effort in the data processing, making this a critical part of the mission. ESA, the national agencies and the Euclid Consortium are spending considerable resources to set up teams of researchers and engineers in algorithm development, software development, testing and validation procedures, data archiving and data distribution infrastructures.

In total, nine Science Data Centres spread over countries of the Euclid Consortium will process more than 170 petabytes of raw input images over at least 6 years to deliver data products (images, catalogues spectra) in three main public data releases in the Science Archive System of the Euclid mission to the scientific community.

With its wide sky coverage and its catalogues of billions of stars and galaxies, the scientific value of data collected by the mission goes beyond the scope of cosmology. This database will provide the worldwide astronomical community with sources and targets for the James Webb Space Telescope, Atacama Large Millimeter Array and the Vera C. Rubin Observatory, as well as future missions such as the Extremely Large Telescope, Thirty Meter Telescope and Square Kilometer Array.

== Spacecraft ==
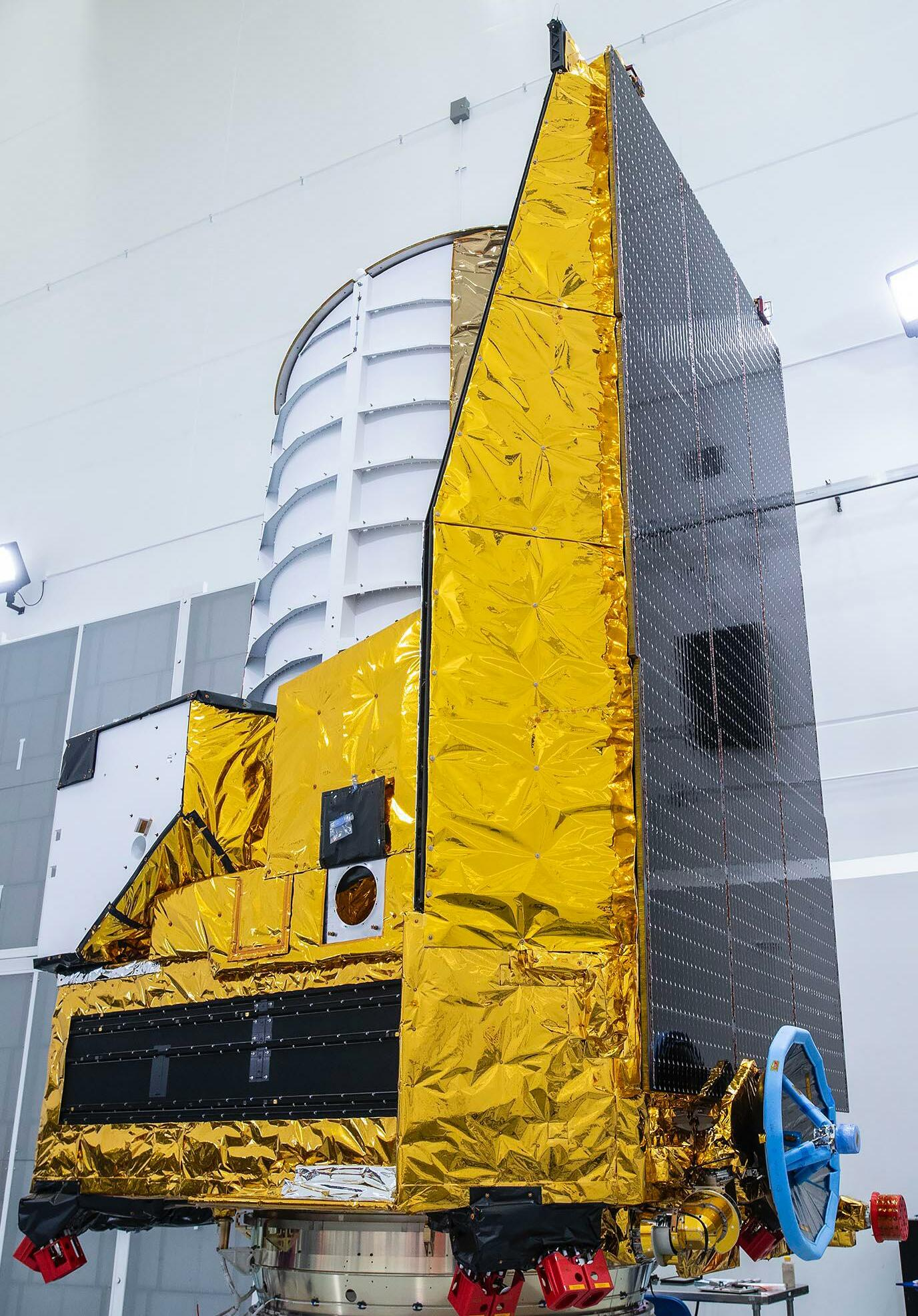
Euclid in a cleanroom

ESA selected Thales Alenia Space's Italian division for the construction of the spacecraft in Turin. Euclid is 4.5 metres long with a diameter of 3.1 metres and a mass of 2 tonnes. The Euclid payload module was the responsibility of Airbus Defence and Space's French division in Toulouse. It consists of a Korsch telescope with a primary mirror 1.2 meters in diameter, which covers an area of 0.91 deg^{2}.

The Euclid consortium, comprising scientists from 13 European countries and the United States, provided the visible-light camera (VIS) and the near-infrared spectrometer and photometer (NISP). Together, they will map the 3D distribution of up to two billion galaxies spread over more than a third of the whole sky. These large-format cameras will be used to characterise the morphometric, photometric, and spectroscopic properties of galaxies.

=== Instruments ===
- VIS, a camera operating at visible wavelengths (530–920 nm), made of a mosaic of 6 × 6 e2v charge coupled detectors, containing 600 million pixels, allows measurement of the deformation of galaxies
- NISP, a camera composed of a mosaic of 4 × 4 Teledyne H2RG detectors sensitive to near-infrared light radiation (920–2020 nm) with 65 million pixels, is designed for the following:
1. provide low-precision measurements of redshifts, and thus distances, of over a billion galaxies from multi-color (3-filter (Y, J and H)) photometry (photometric redshift technique); and
2. use a slitless spectrometer to analyse the spectrum of light in near-infrared (920–1850 nm), to acquire precise redshifts and distances of millions of galaxies with an accuracy 10 times better than photometric redshifts, and to determine the baryon acoustic oscillations.

=== Spacecraft bus ===
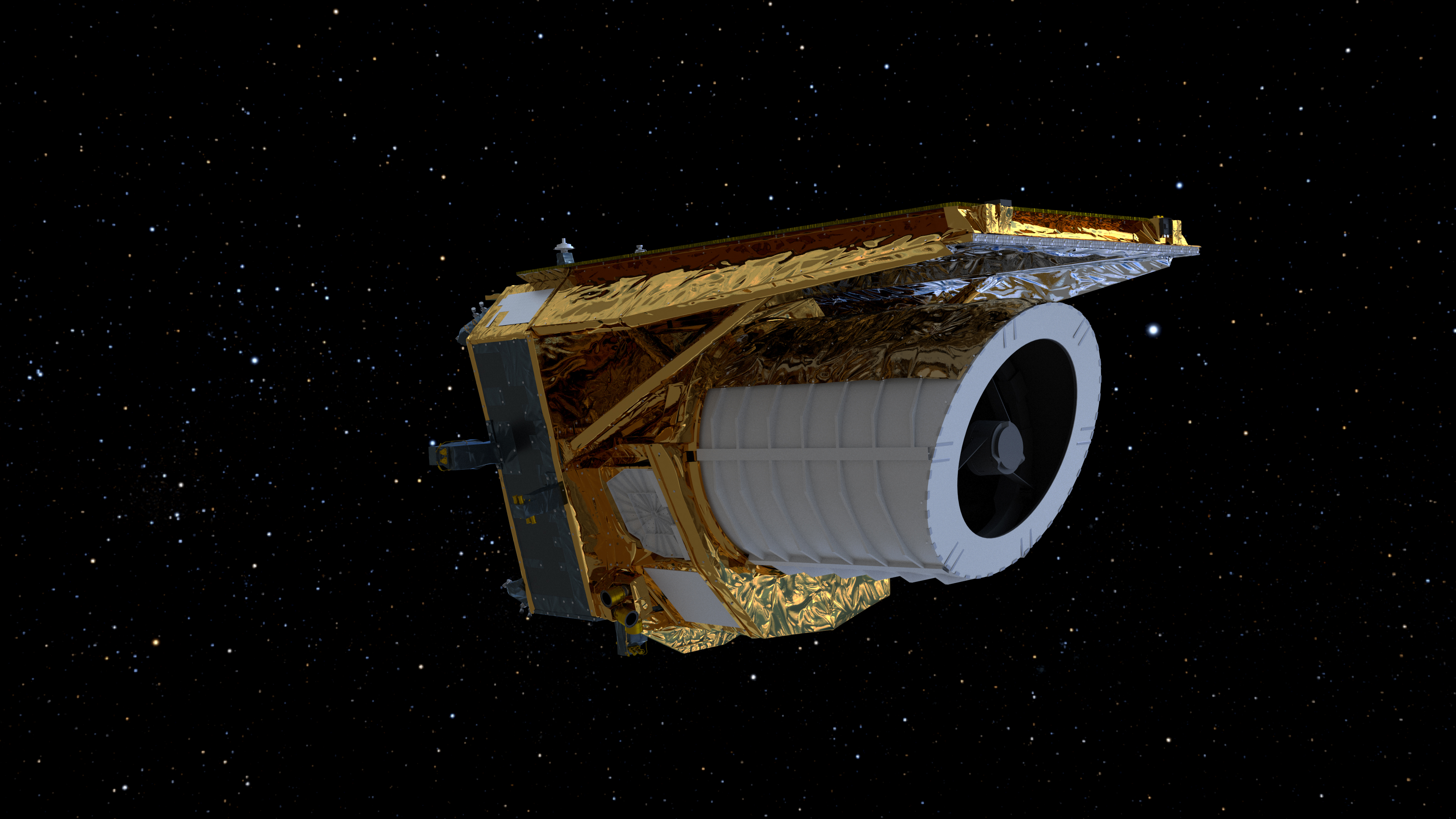
Euclid space telescope

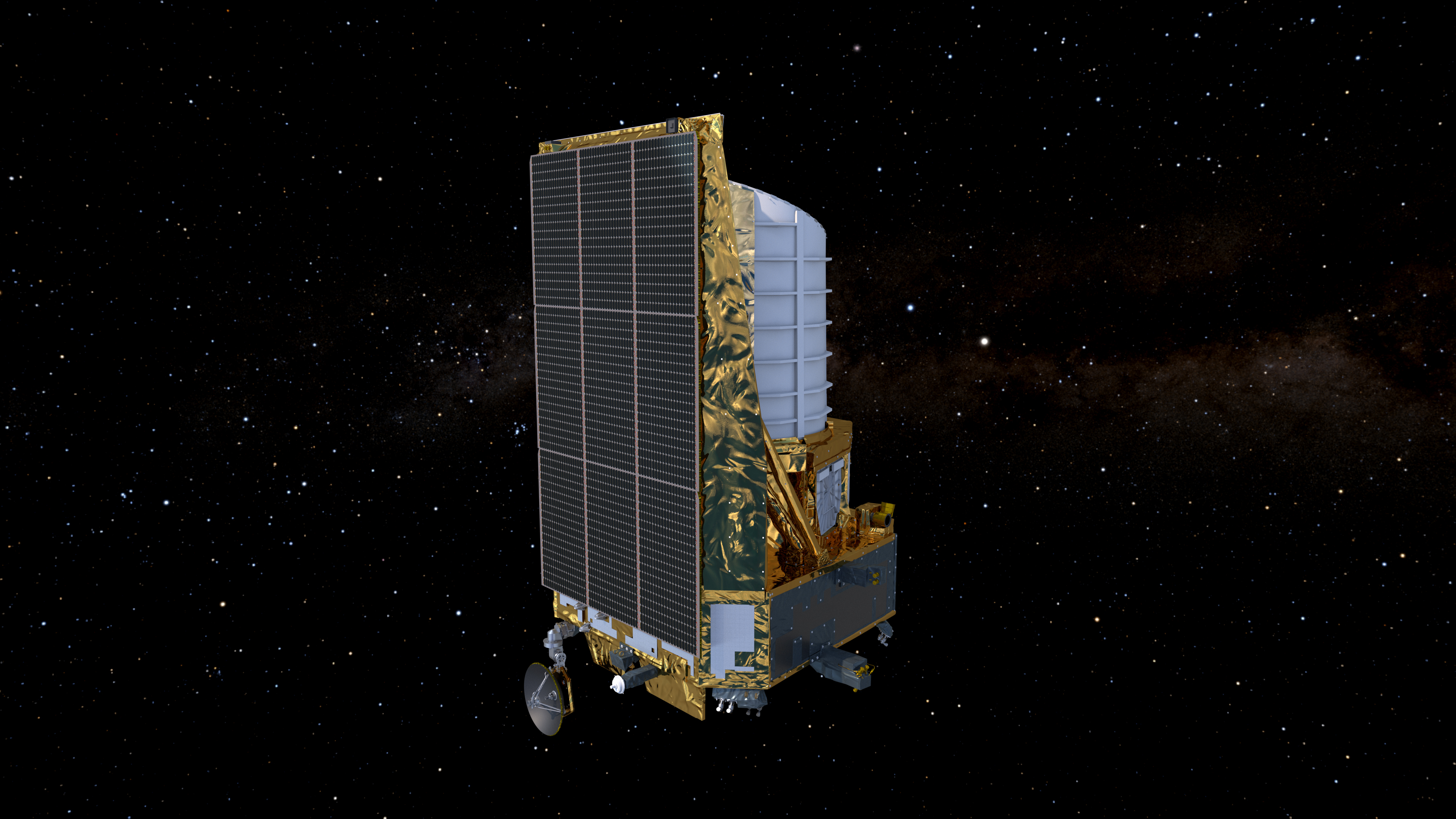
Euclid's solar panel

The telescope bus includes solar panels that provide power and stabilise the orientation and pointing of the telescope to better than 35 milliarcseconds (170 nrad). The telescope is insulated to ensure good thermal stability so as to not disturb the optical alignment.

The telecommunications system is capable of transferring 850 gigabits per day. It uses the Ka band and CCSDS File Delivery Protocol to send scientific data at a rate of 55 megabits per second for 4 hours per day to the 35 m dish Cebreros ground station in Spain, when the telescope is above the horizon. Euclid has an onboard storage capacity of 4 terabits (500 GB).

The service module (SVM) hosts most of the spacecraft subsystems:

- TT&C – Telemetry and Telecommand
- AOCS – Attitude Orbit Control System
- CDMS – Central Data Management System
- EPS – Electrical Power System
- RCS – Reaction Control System
- MPS – Micro-Propulsion System

AOCS provides stable pointing with a dispersion beneath 35 milli-arcseconds per visual exposure. A high thermal stability is required to protect the telescope assembly from optical misalignments at those accuracies.

== Project history ==
=== Development ===
Euclid emerged from two mission concepts that were proposed in response to the ESA Cosmic Vision 2015–2025 Call for Proposals, issued in March 2007: DUNE, the Dark Universe Explorer, and SPACE, the Spectroscopic All-Sky Cosmic Explorer. Both missions proposed complementary techniques to measure the geometry of the universe, and after an assessment study phase, a combined mission resulted. The new mission concept was called Euclid, honouring the Greek mathematician Euclid of Alexandria (~300 BC), who is considered the father of geometry. In October 2011, Euclid was selected by ESA's Science Programme Committee for implementation, and on 25 June 2012 it was formally adopted.

NASA signed a memorandum of understanding with ESA on 24 January 2013 describing its participation in the mission. NASA provided 20 detectors for the near-infrared band instrument, which operate in parallel with a camera in the visible-light band. The instruments, the telescope, and the satellite were built-in and are operated from Europe. NASA has also appointed 40 American scientists to be part of the Euclid consortium, which developed the instruments and analyse the data generated by the mission. Currently, this consortium brings together more than 1000 scientists from 13 European countries and the United States.

In 2015, Euclid passed a preliminary design review, having completed a large number of technical designs as well as built and tested key components. In December 2018, Euclid passed its critical design review, which validated the overall spacecraft design and mission architecture plan, and final spacecraft assembly was allowed to commence. In July 2020, the two instruments (visible and NIR) were delivered to Airbus, Toulouse, France for integration with the spacecraft.

=== In space ===
After Russia withdrew in 2022 from the Soyuz-planned launch of Euclid, the ESA reassigned it to a SpaceX Falcon 9 launch vehicle, which launched on 1 July 2023 from Cape Canaveral Space Launch Complex 40. Following a travel time of 30 days after launch, it began to orbit the Sun-Earth Lagrangian point L2 in an eclipse-free halo orbit about 1 million km wide.

Upon receiving the initial images, a problem surfaced as scientists discovered a small gap in the spacecraft's hull. This gap allowed sunlight to infiltrate the imaging sensor, resulting in a degradation of image quality. To tackle this issue, the team adjusted the spacecraft's orientation by a few degrees, effectively blocking sunlight from entering the identified gap. This corrective measure resolved the problem.

Animation of Euclid

Around the Earth

Around the Sun – Frame rotating with Earth – Top view

Around the Sun – Frame rotating with Earth – Viewed from the Sun

Euclid · Earth · Sun-Earth L2

=== Data releases ===
In May 2024 the Early Release Observations (ERO) was the first published data release. This release contains images and catalogs of star-forming regions, globular clusters, nearby galaxies, fields of the Fornax cluster and Perseus cluster, as well as more distant galaxy clusters. The content of the ERO is described in one paper submitted to Astronomy & Astrophysics. The researchers use a pipeline that can process the images in two ways: optimized for point-sources or optimized for extended sources. A series of papers describe first results from ERO. These include free-floating planetary-mass objects discovered in the Sigma Orionis cluster, discovery of new gravitational lenses, and the discovery of a dwarf satellite galaxy around NGC 6744.

The Quick Euclid data release 1 (Q1) went live on 19th March 2025. Three deep fields can be explored on ESASky, a web-based tool. The data products can be accessed via the Euclid Science Archive, hosted at ESAC or via IRSA. Q1 compromises of Euclid Deep Field North (EDF-N), Euclid Deep Field South (EDF-S), and Euclid Deep Field Fornax (EDF-F). These deep fields cover an area of 63.1 square degrees. EDF-F is centered on the same region as the Chandra Deep Field South (CDFS). Euclid will continue to observe these deep fields until DR3, which will be 2 mag deeper than the Euclid Wide Survey. Additionally Q1 includes an 0.5 square degree observation of LDN 1641 in the Orion A Cloud.

The Euclid Quick Data Release 2 (Q2) went live on 24th June 2026. One field, showing the Milky Way's galactic bulge, can be explored on ESASky.

The Euclid Data Release 1 Foundation (DR1-Foundation) went live on 12 November 2026. It included over 900 million galaxies, around 15,000 strong gravitational lensing candidates, over 60 million quasar candidates, the spectra from more than 160 million sources, and Euclid Wide Survey results from 1900 deg^{2} of sky.

The next data release is Data Release 1 (DR1), planned for 16 June 2027. Future data releases include Quick Data Release 3 (Q3), planned for 2028, Data Release 2 (DR2), planned for June 2029, Quick Data Release 4 (Q4), planned for 2030, and Data Release 3 (DR3), planned for October 2031.

== Gallery ==
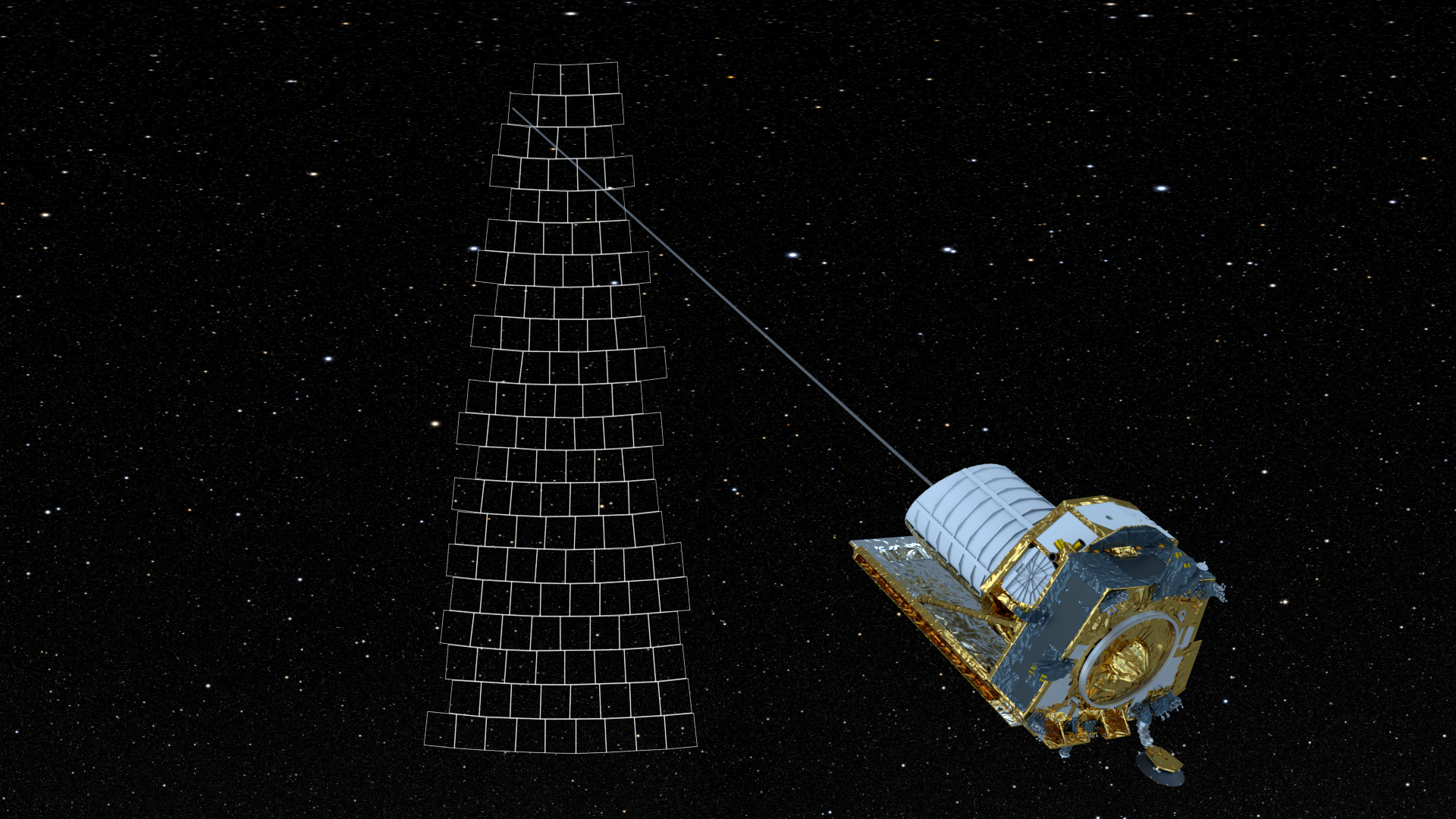
Euclid scans across the night sky using a "step-and-stare" method, combining separate measurements to form the largest cosmological survey ever conducted in the visible and near-infrared.

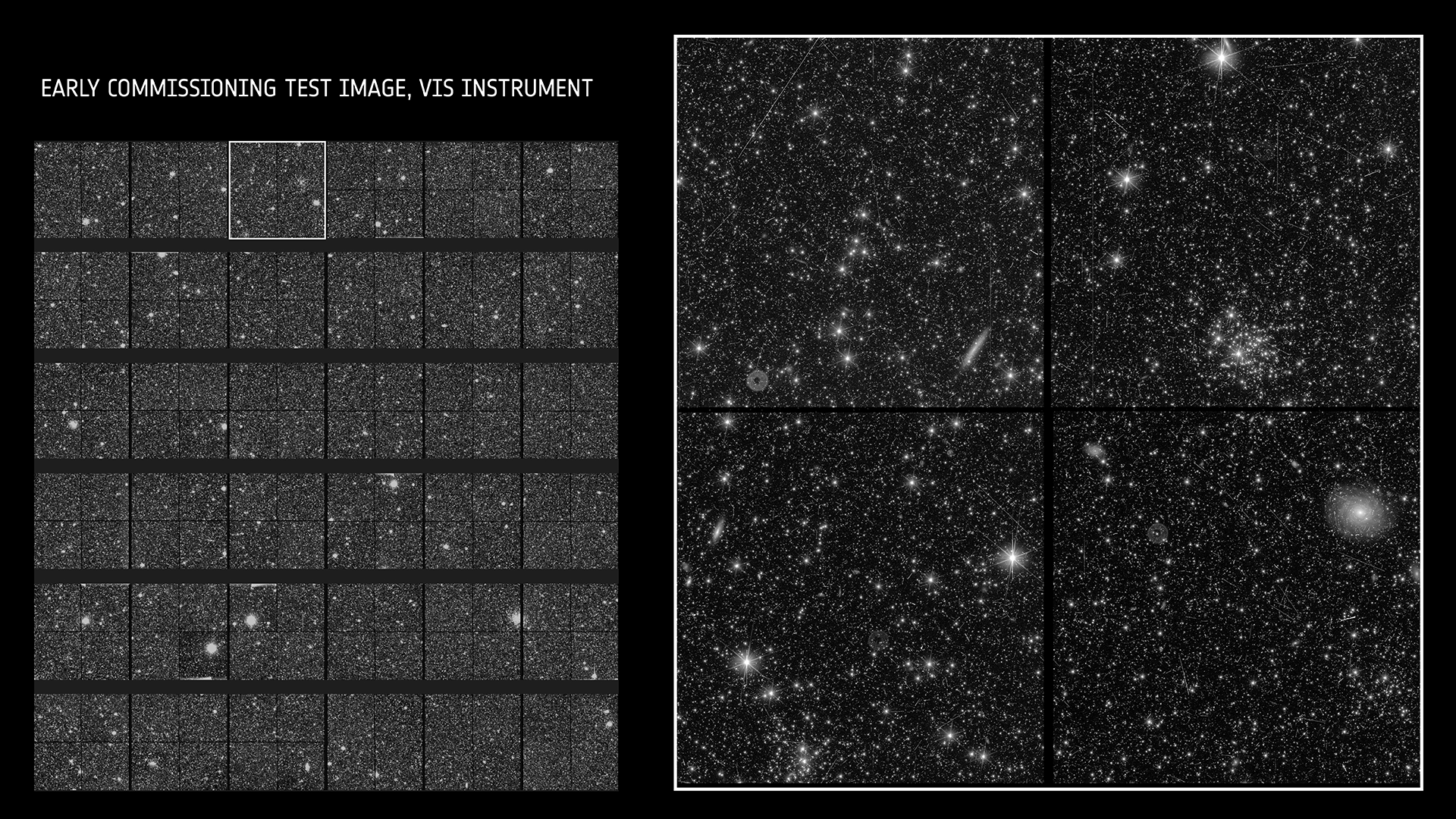
Early commissioning test image VIS instrument

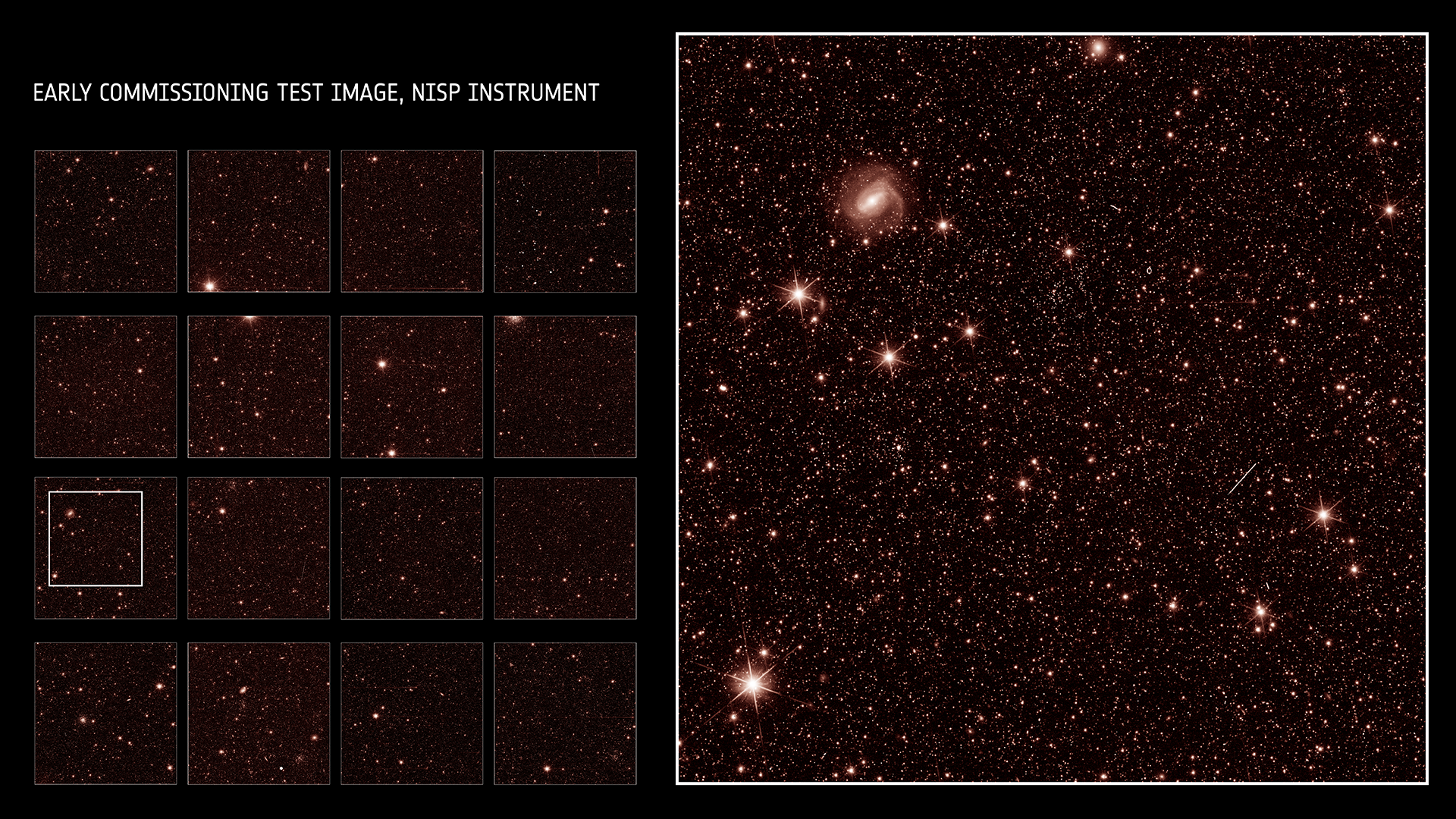
Early commissioning test image NISP instrument

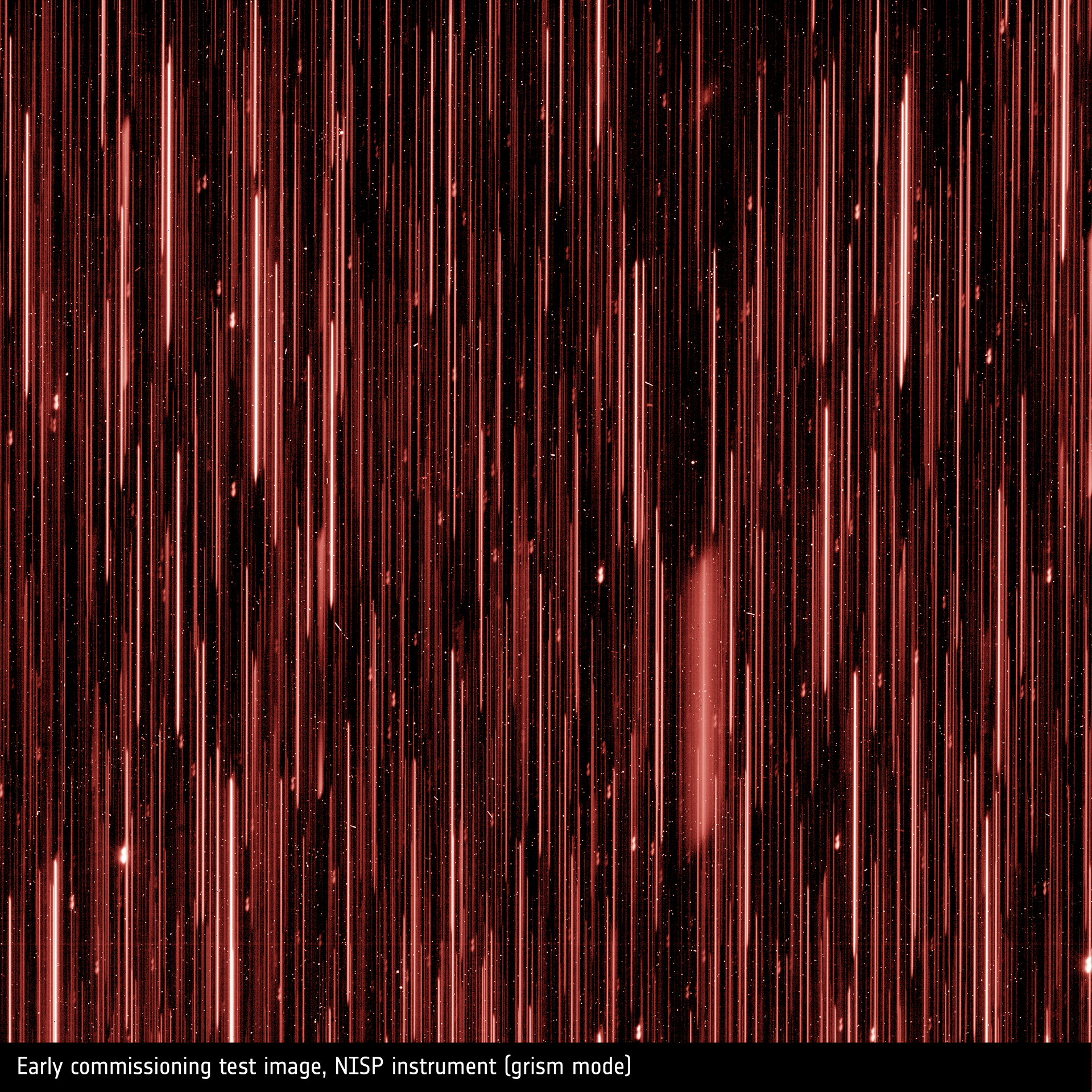
Early commissioning test image NISP instrument grism mode

Euclid's view of the Horsehead Nebula.

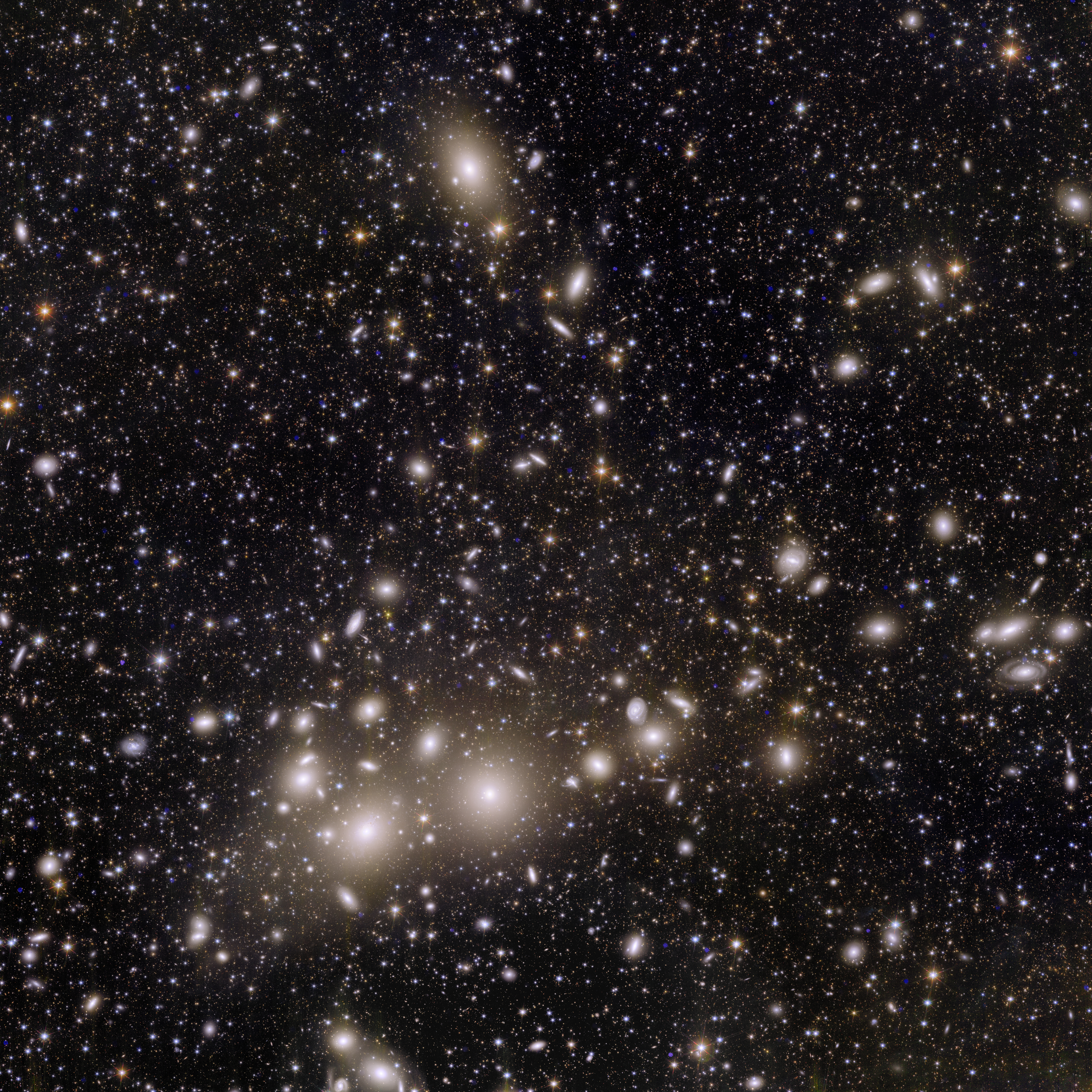
Euclid's view of the Perseus cluster of galaxies.

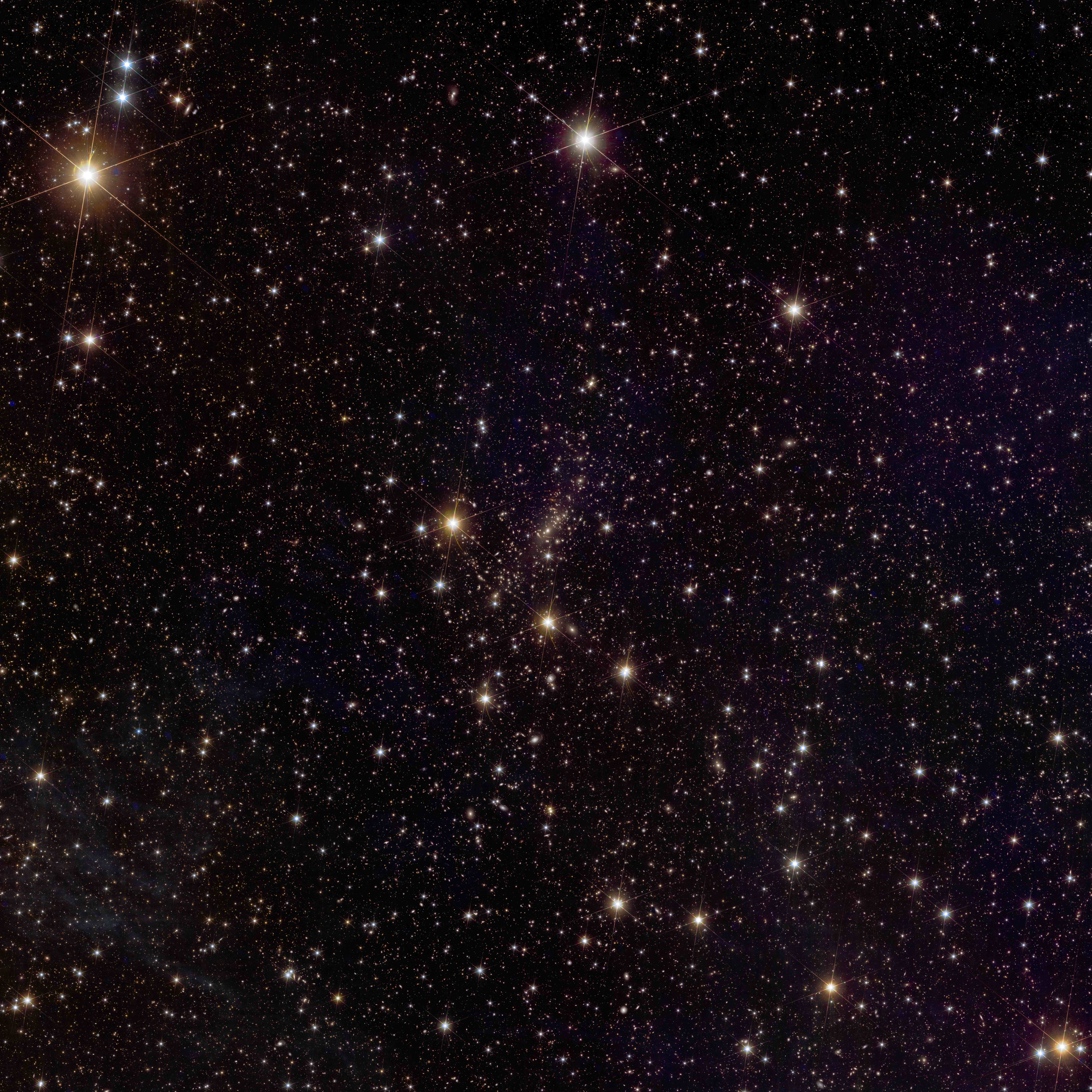
Euclid's view of galaxy cluster Abell 2390.

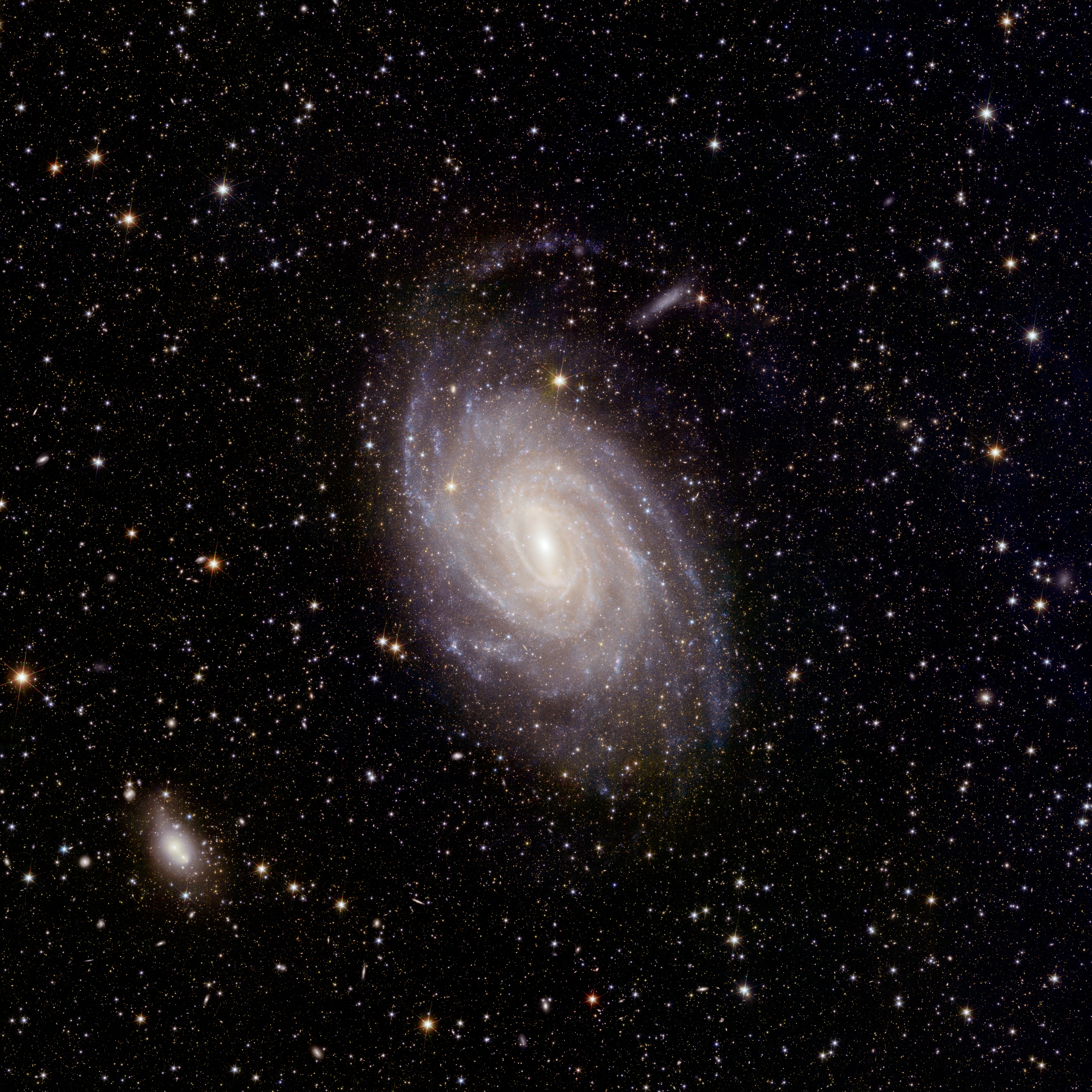
Euclid's view of spiral galaxy NGC 6744.

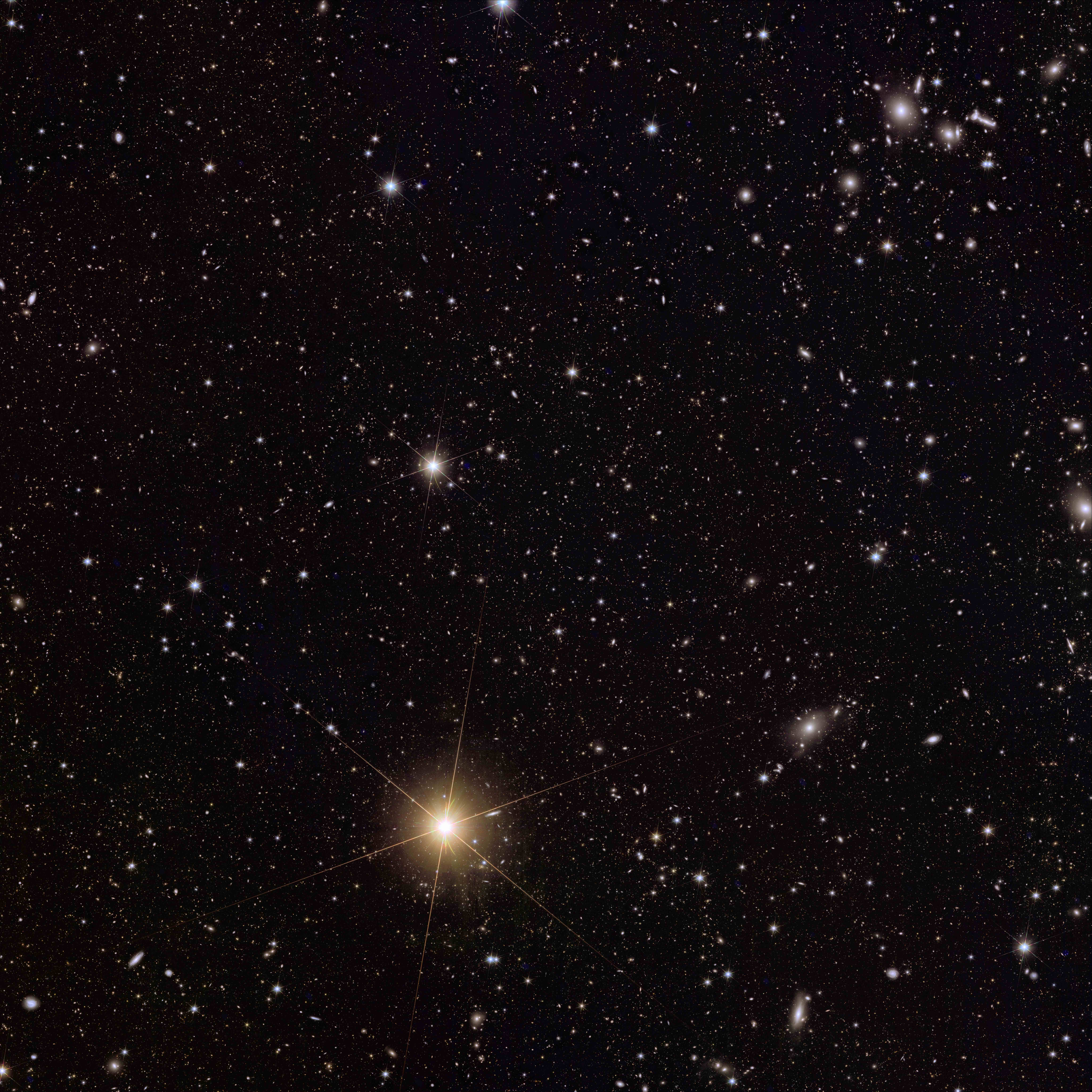
Euclid's view of galaxy cluster Abell 2764.

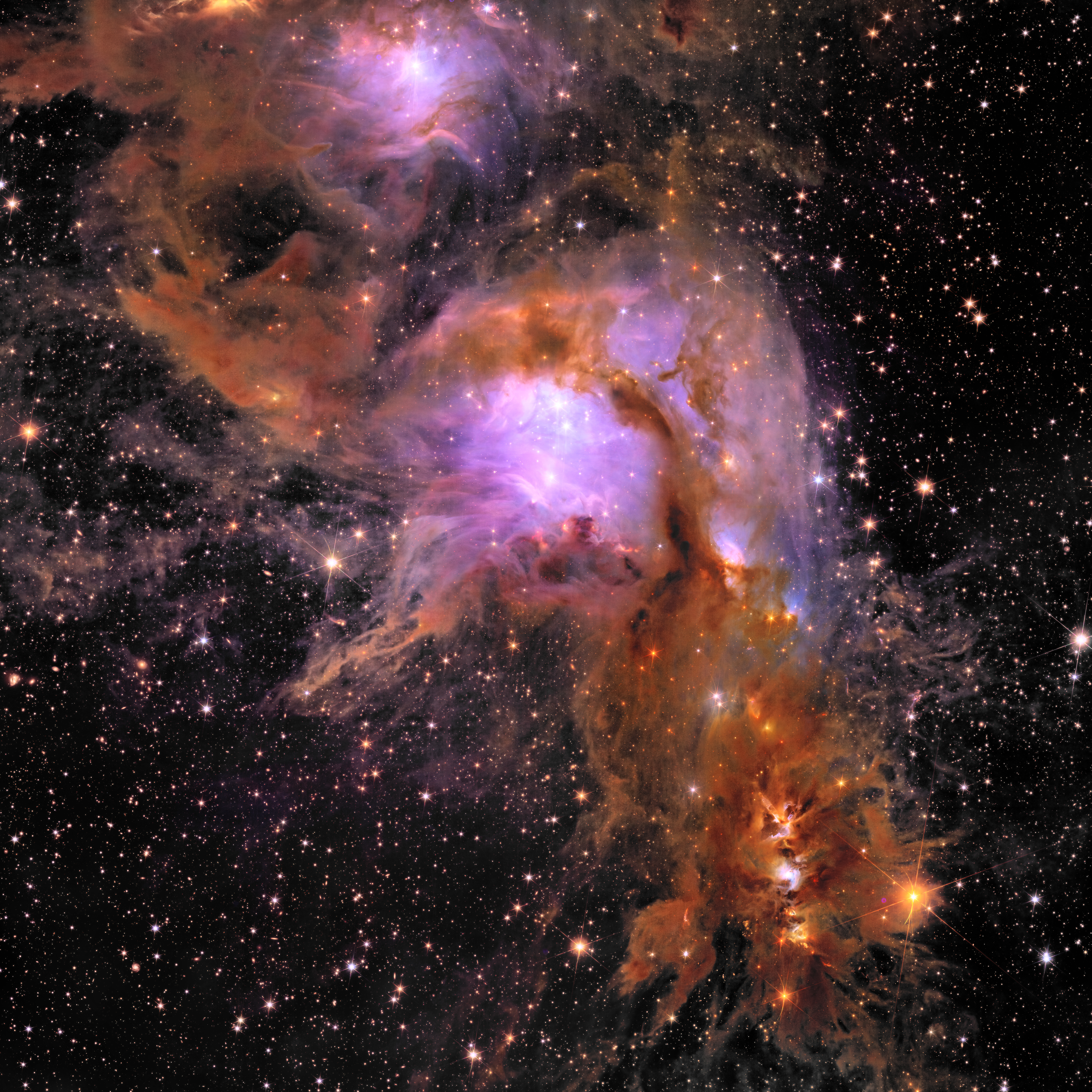
Euclid's view of star-forming region Messier 78 (middle), NGC 2071 (top) and HH 24-26 (bottom).

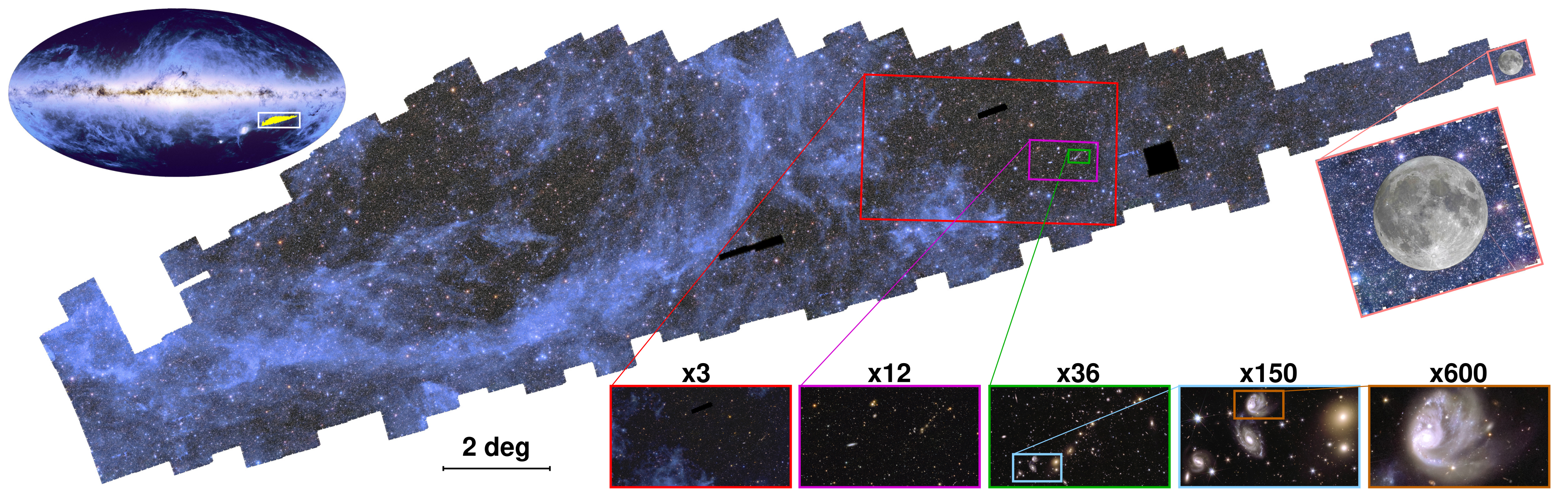
The mosaic and zoomed in images released by ESA’s Euclid mission on 15 October 2024

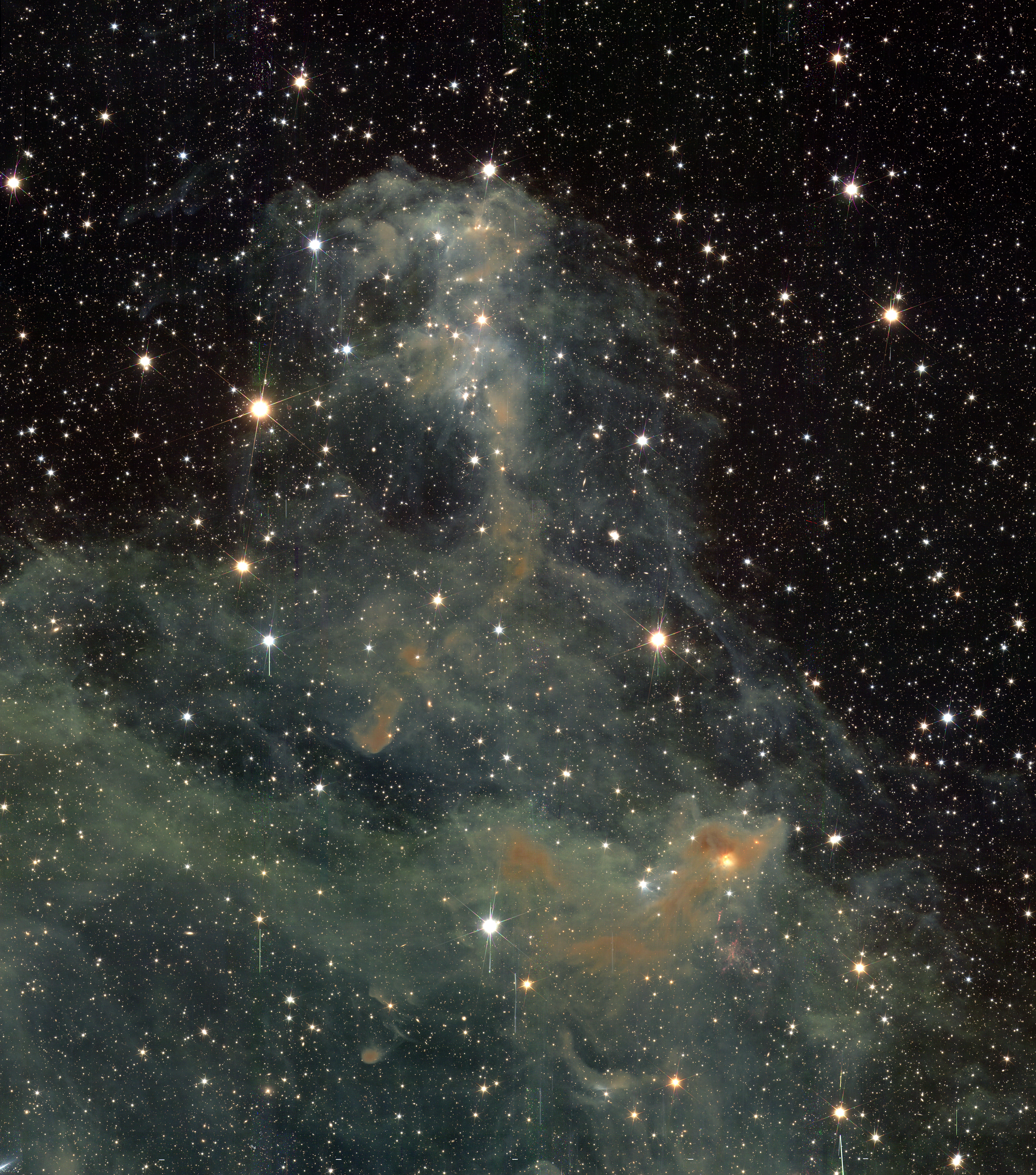
Barnard 30 with Euclid

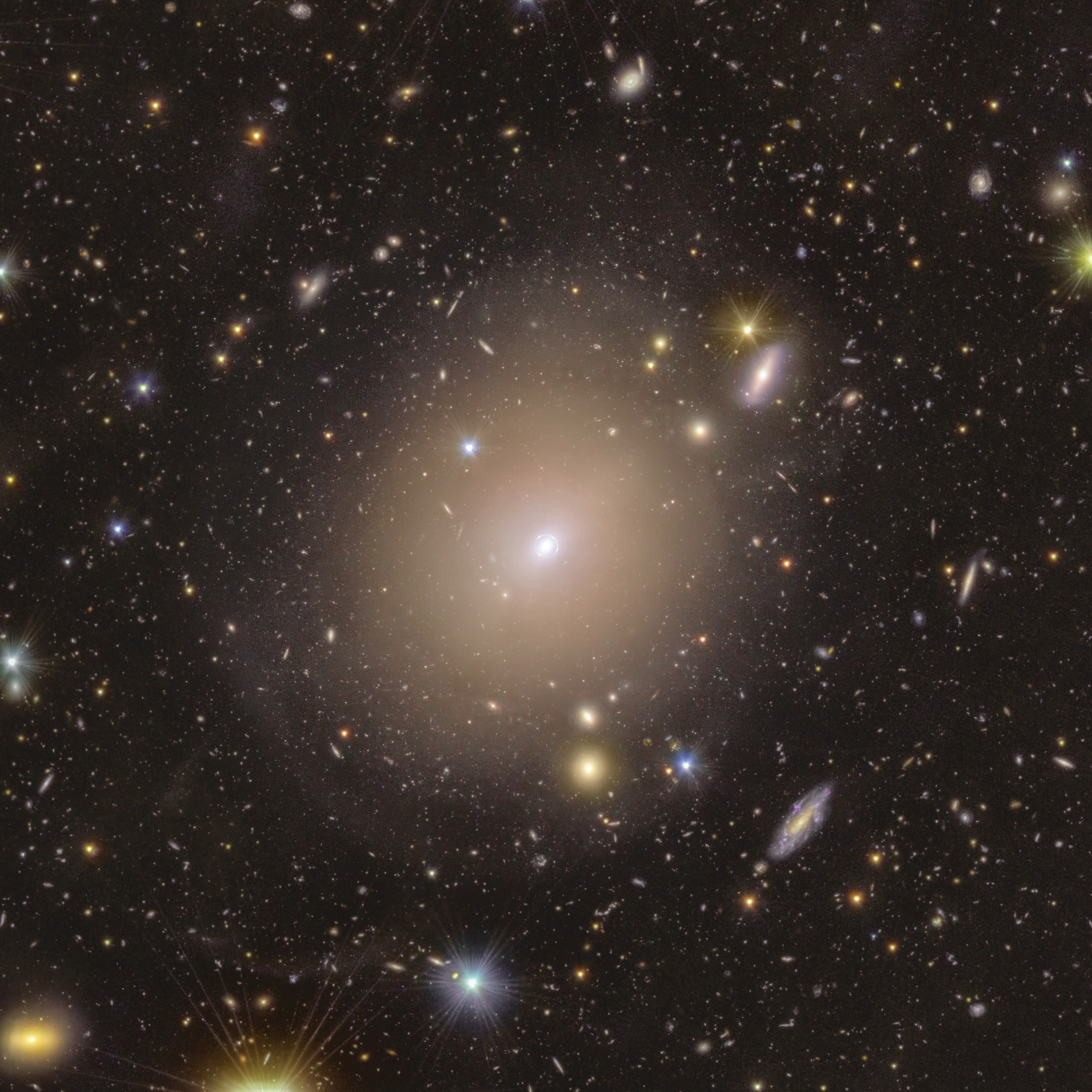
The galaxy NGC 6505 with an Einstein ring in its centre, which was discovered with Euclid.

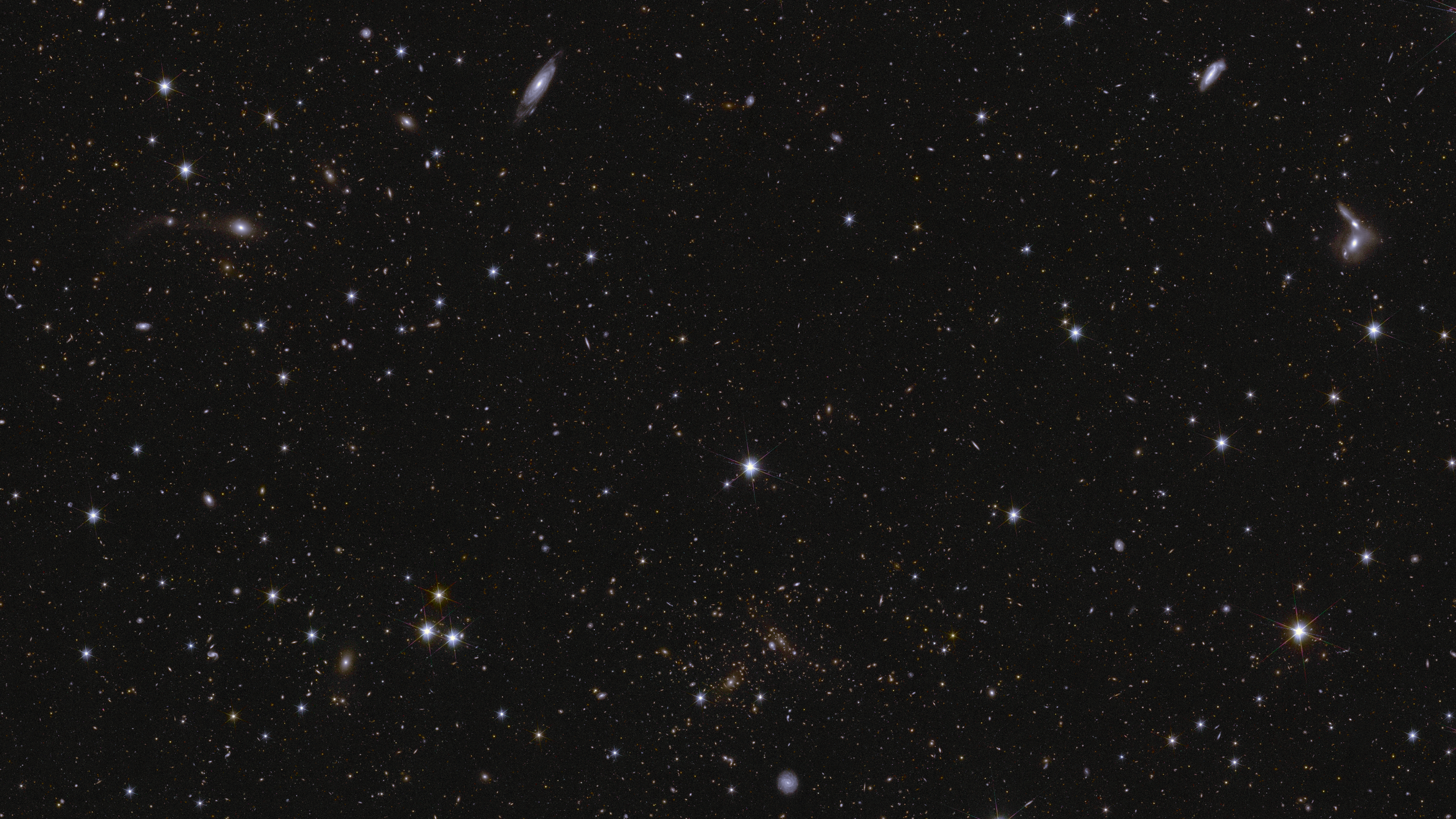
This image shows an area of Euclid’s Deep Field South. The area is zoomed in 16 times compared to the large mosaic.

Euclid's view of the Milky Way's galactic bulge

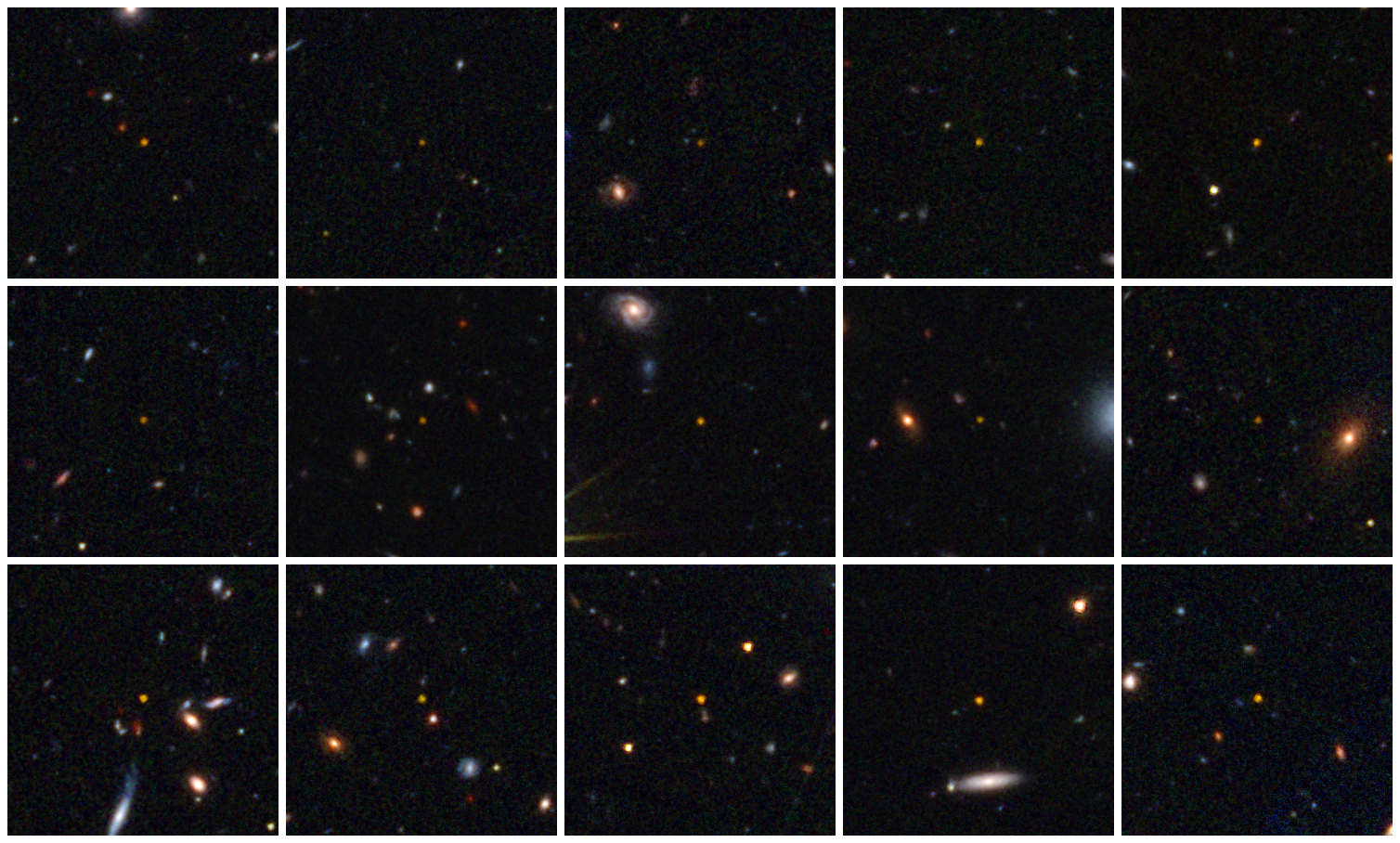
31 new Quasars discovered by Euclid (2026)

Image of comet C/2026 S1 (Euclid)

ESA 12 November 2026 release of first major batch of data that captures the light of more than a billion objects and covers an area of sky as big as 9500 full Moons.

== See also ==
- List of space telescopes
- James Webb Space Telescope – NASA/ESA/CSA infrared space telescope launched in 2021
- Nancy Grace Roman Space Telescope – NASA infrared space telescope launched in 2026
- Spitzer Space Telescope – NASA infrared space telescope (2003–2020)
