= NGC 2071 =

Reflection nebula in the constellation Orion

Reflection nebula
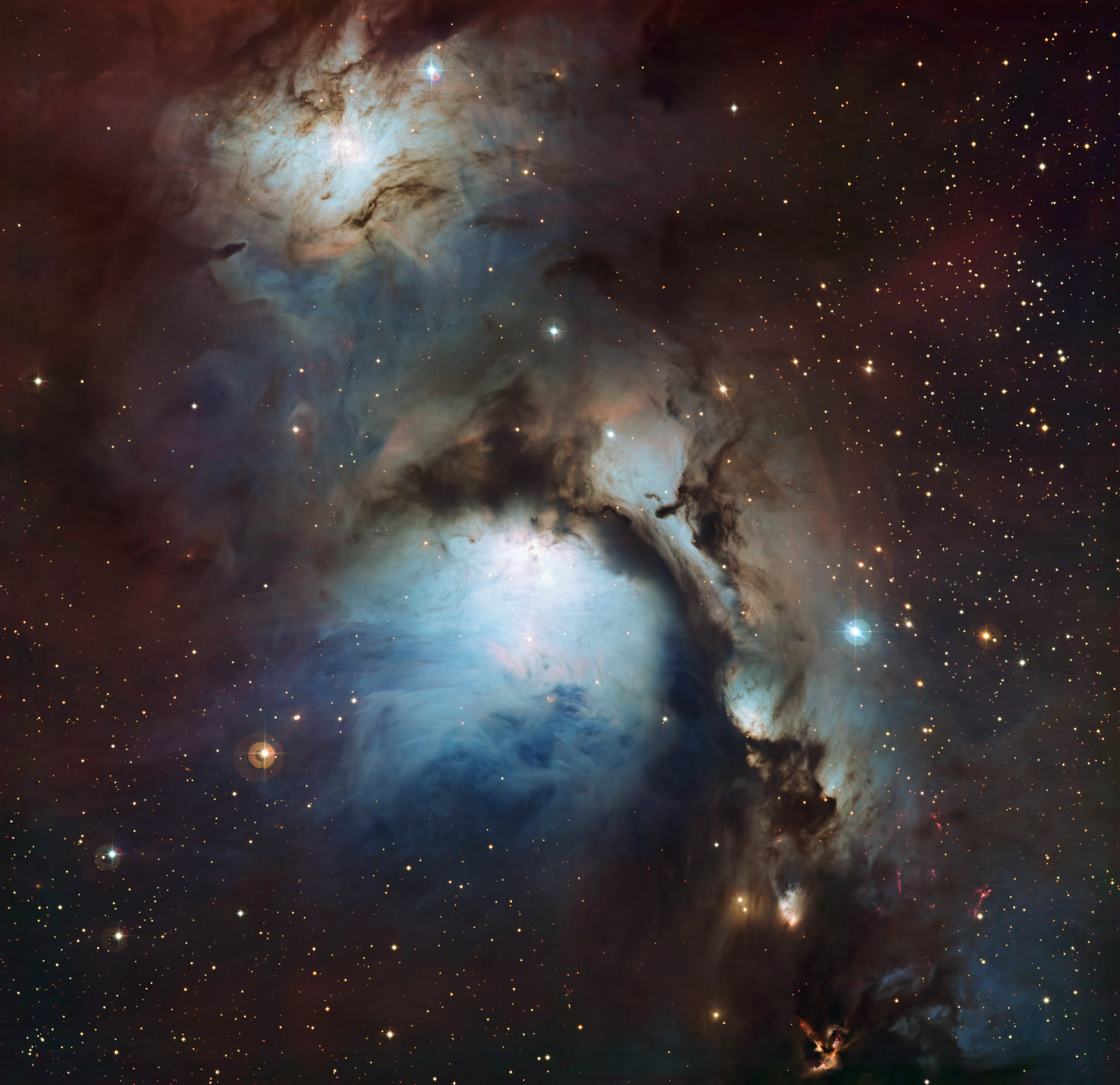
- NGC 2071 is the nebula at the top of this image captured using the Wide Field Imager camera on the MPG/ESO 2.2-metre telescope at the La Silla Observatory. The bright nebula in the centre is Messier 78.

Observation data: J2000.0 epoch
- Right ascension: 05^{h} 47^{m} 07.2^{s}
- Declination: +00° 17′ 39″
- Distance: 1,300 ly (About 400 pc)
- Apparent dimensions (V): 7.0' × 5.0'
- Constellation: Orion

Physical characteristics
- Dimensions: 4 ly
- Designations: LBN 938

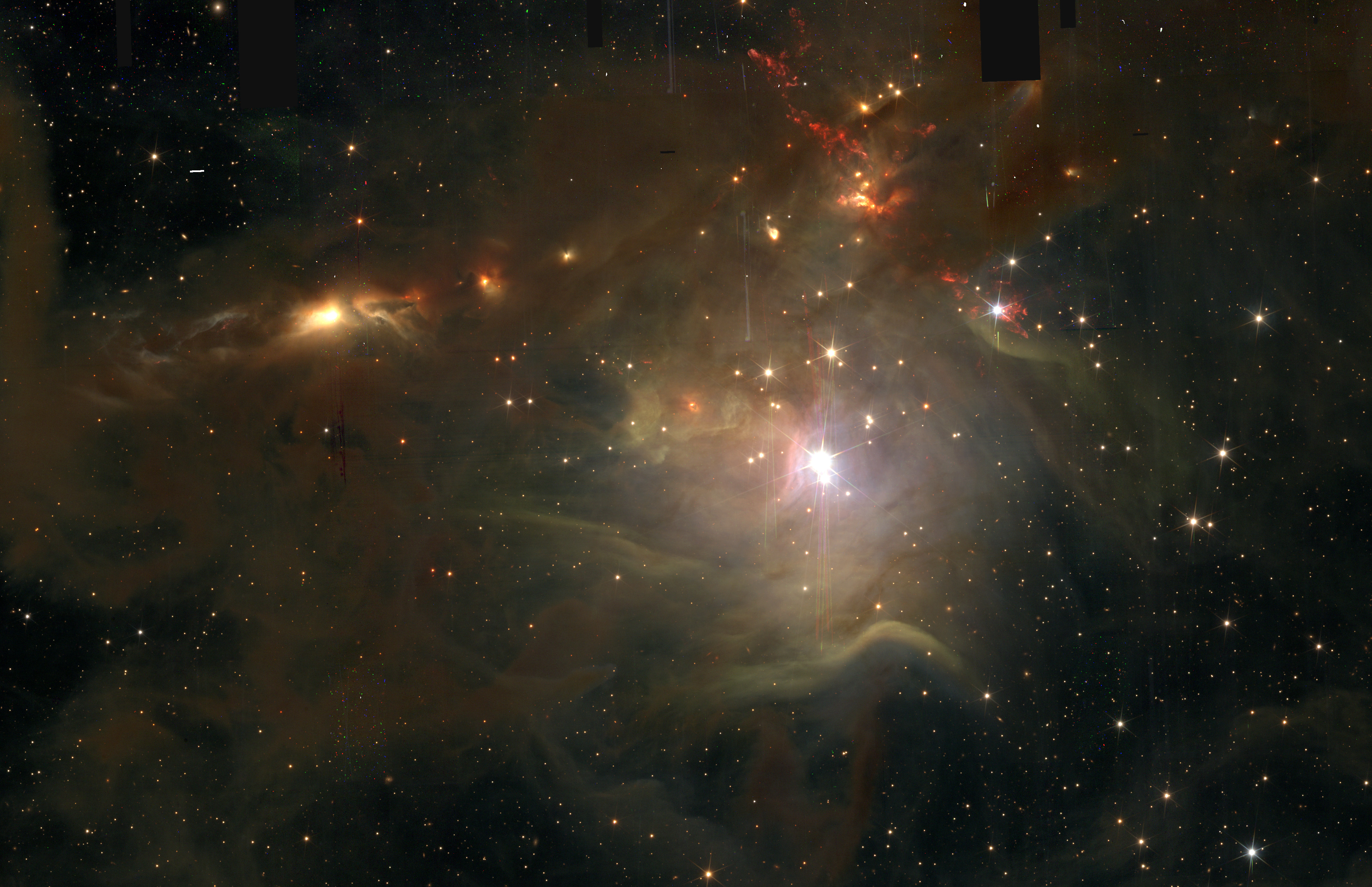
NGC 2071 with Euclid in the infrared

NGC 2071 is a reflection nebula in the constellation Orion. It was discovered on January 1, 1784, by William Herschel. It is part of a group of nebulae that also includes Messier 78, NGC 2064, and NGC 2067.

The star HD 290861 is located in the center of NGC 2071. It is the illuminating star of this reflection nebula. The region contains several Herbig-Haro objects, indicating ongoing star-formation.
