= Messier 78 =

Reflection nebula in the constellation of Orion

Reflection nebula
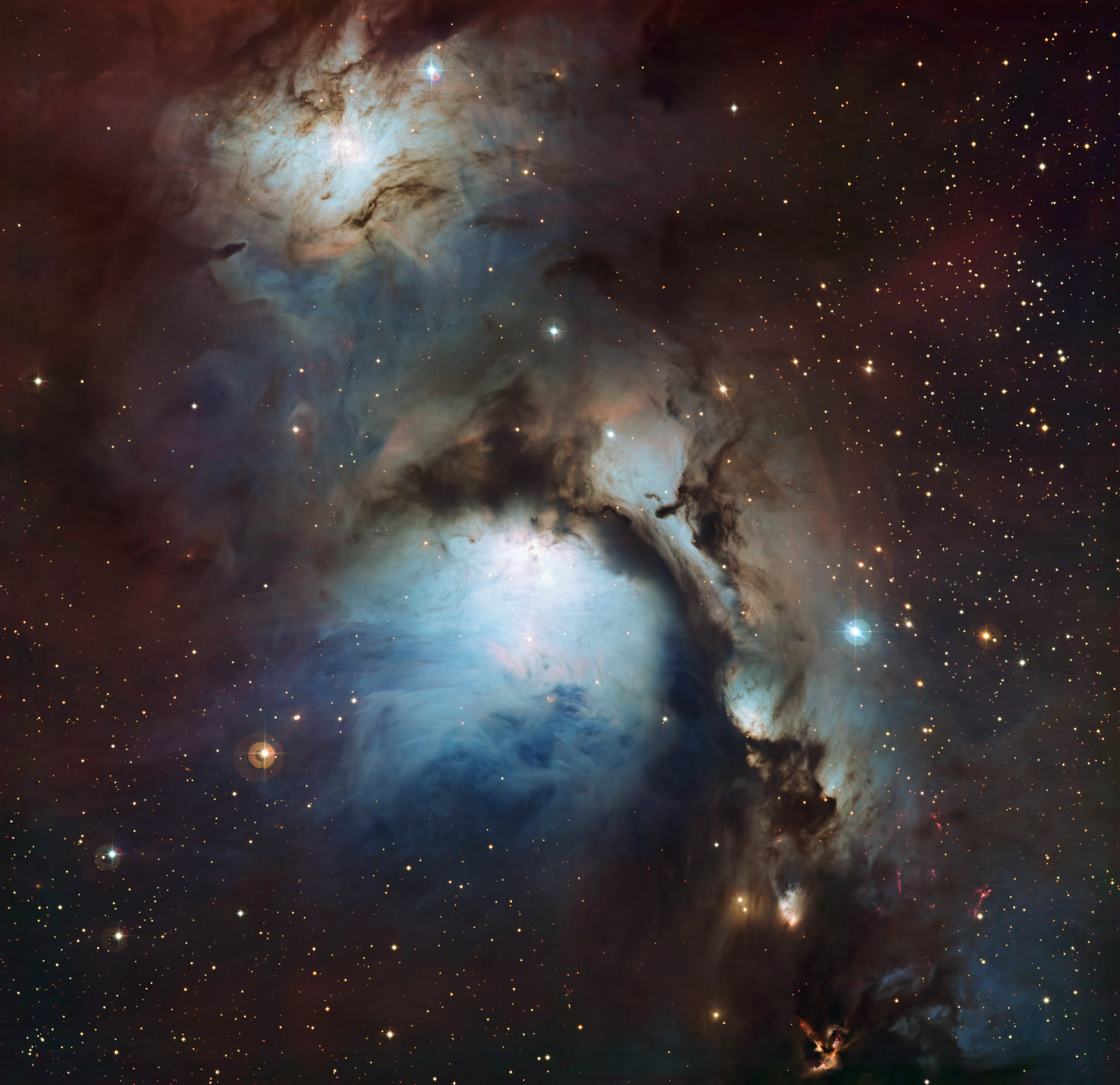
- Image of Messier 78 captured using the Wide Field Imager camera on the MPG/ESO 2.2-metre telescope at the La Silla Observatory.

Observation data: J2000.0 epoch
- Right ascension: 05^{h} 46^{m} 46.7^{s}
- Declination: +00° 00′ 50″
- Distance: 1,350 ly (415 pc) ly
- Apparent magnitude (V): 8.3
- Apparent dimensions (V): 8′ × 6′
- Constellation: Orion

Physical characteristics
- Radius: 5 ly
- Notable features: Part of the Orion complex
- Designations: Ced 55u, DG 80, IRAS 05442-0000, [KPS2012] MWSC 0664, NGC 2068

Messier 78 (also known as M78 or NGC 2068) is a reflection nebula in the constellation Orion. It is the brightest diffuse reflection nebula in a group that includes NGC 2064, NGC 2067, and NGC 2071, all part of the Orion B molecular cloud complex. Located approximately 1,350 light-years from Earth, M78 is visible in small telescopes as a hazy patch illuminated by two B-type stars, HD 38563 A and HD 38563 B, of 10th and 11th magnitude. It is a popular target for amateur astronomers, who have given it the common name Casper the Friendly Ghost Nebula.

== Discovery ==
Discovered by Pierre Méchain in 1780, M78 was included in Charles Messier's catalog of comet-like objects that same year.

== Structure and composition ==
The nebula's dust cloud reflects light from its two central stars, making it visible. Infrared observations reveal an embedded star cluster and a hierarchy of gas clumps with core masses ranging from 0.3 M_{☉} to 5 M_{☉}. M78 hosts:

- 45 T Tauri stars (young stellar objects still forming).
- 17 Herbig–Haro objects (jets emitted by nascent stars).

== Observations ==
On May 23, 2024, the European Space Agency released a high-resolution image of M78 from the Euclid mission, revealing hundreds of thousands of previously unseen objects, including substellar bodies.

== Gallery ==
VISTA image of Messier 78.

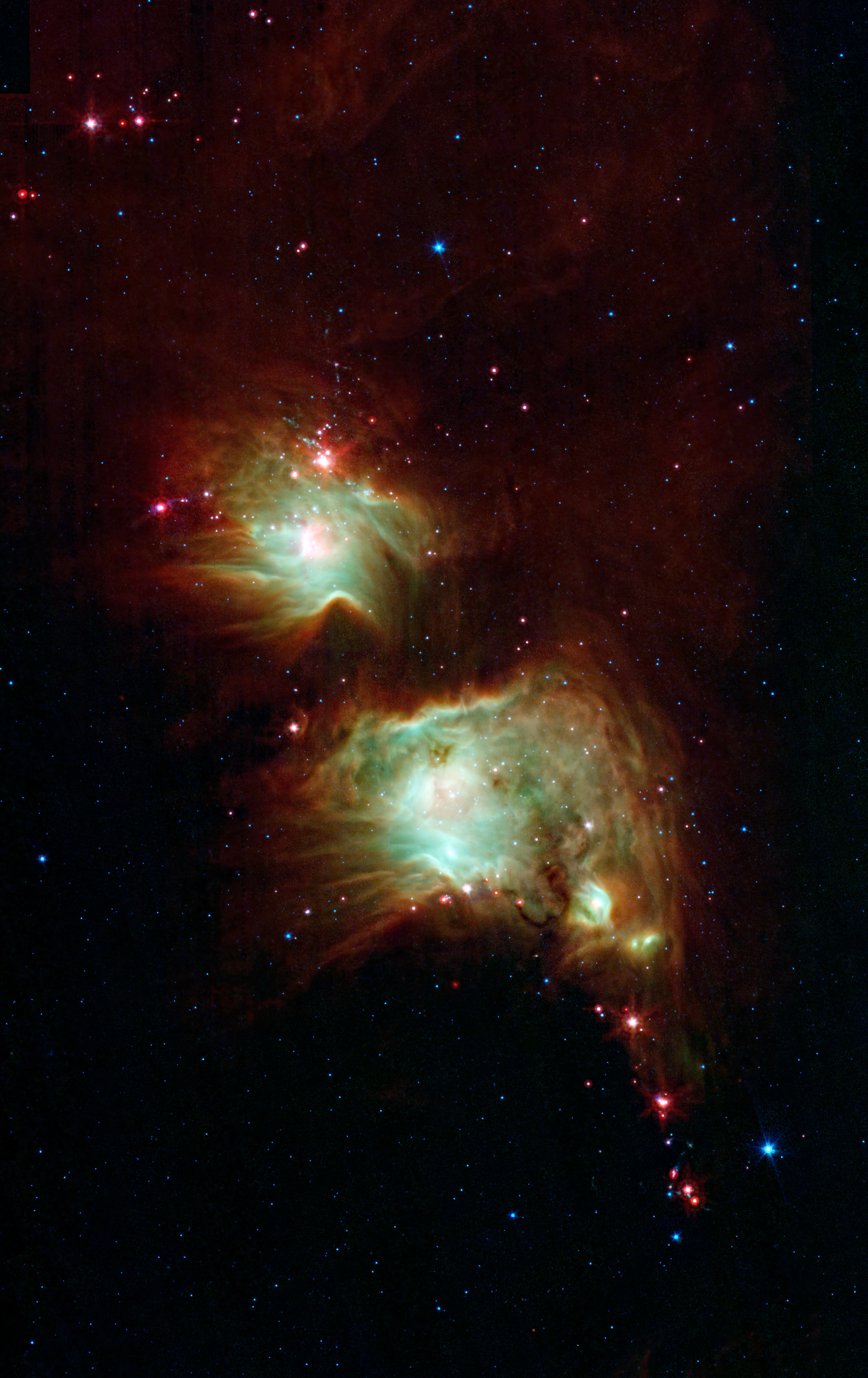
Spitzer image of Messier 78.

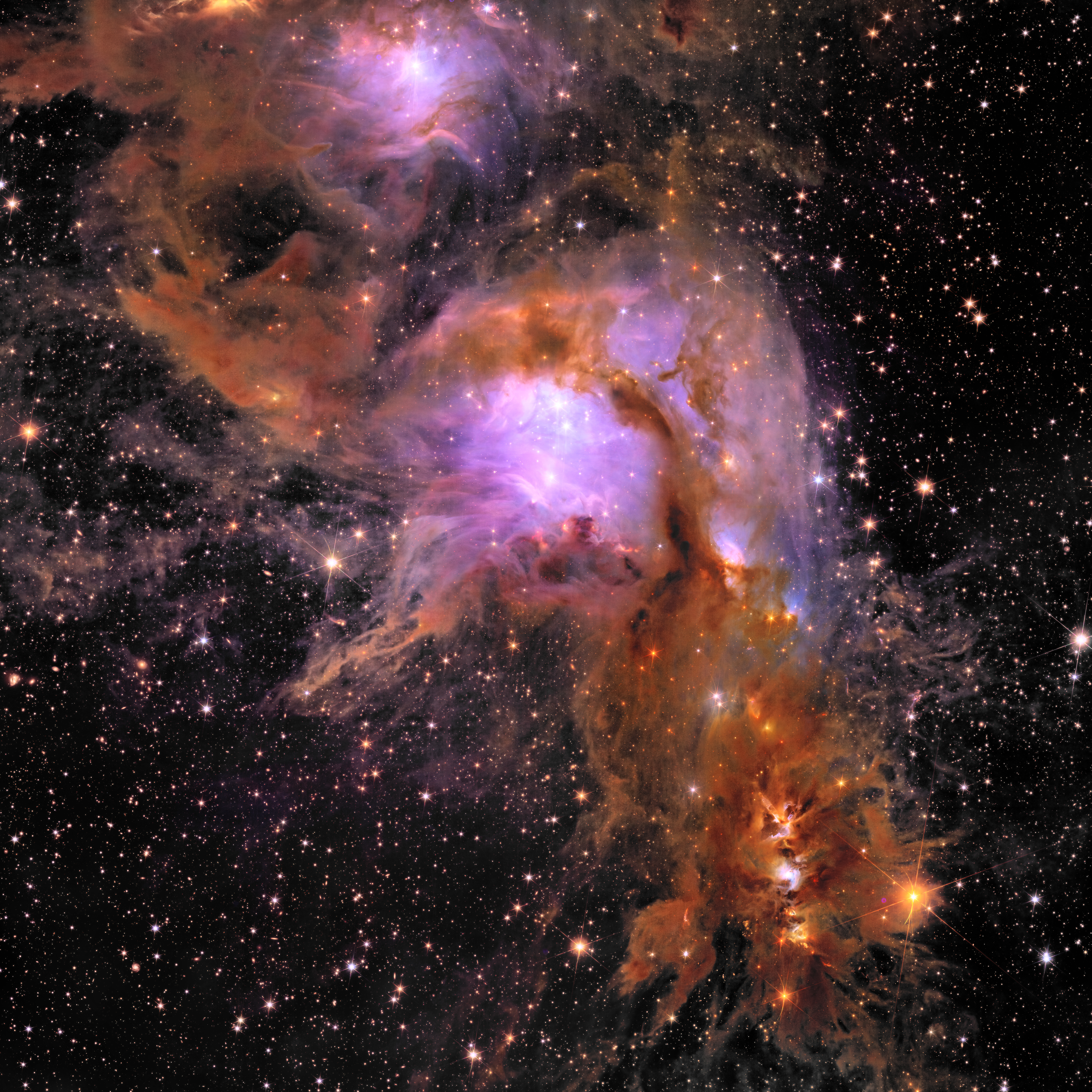
Euclid image of star-forming region Messier 78

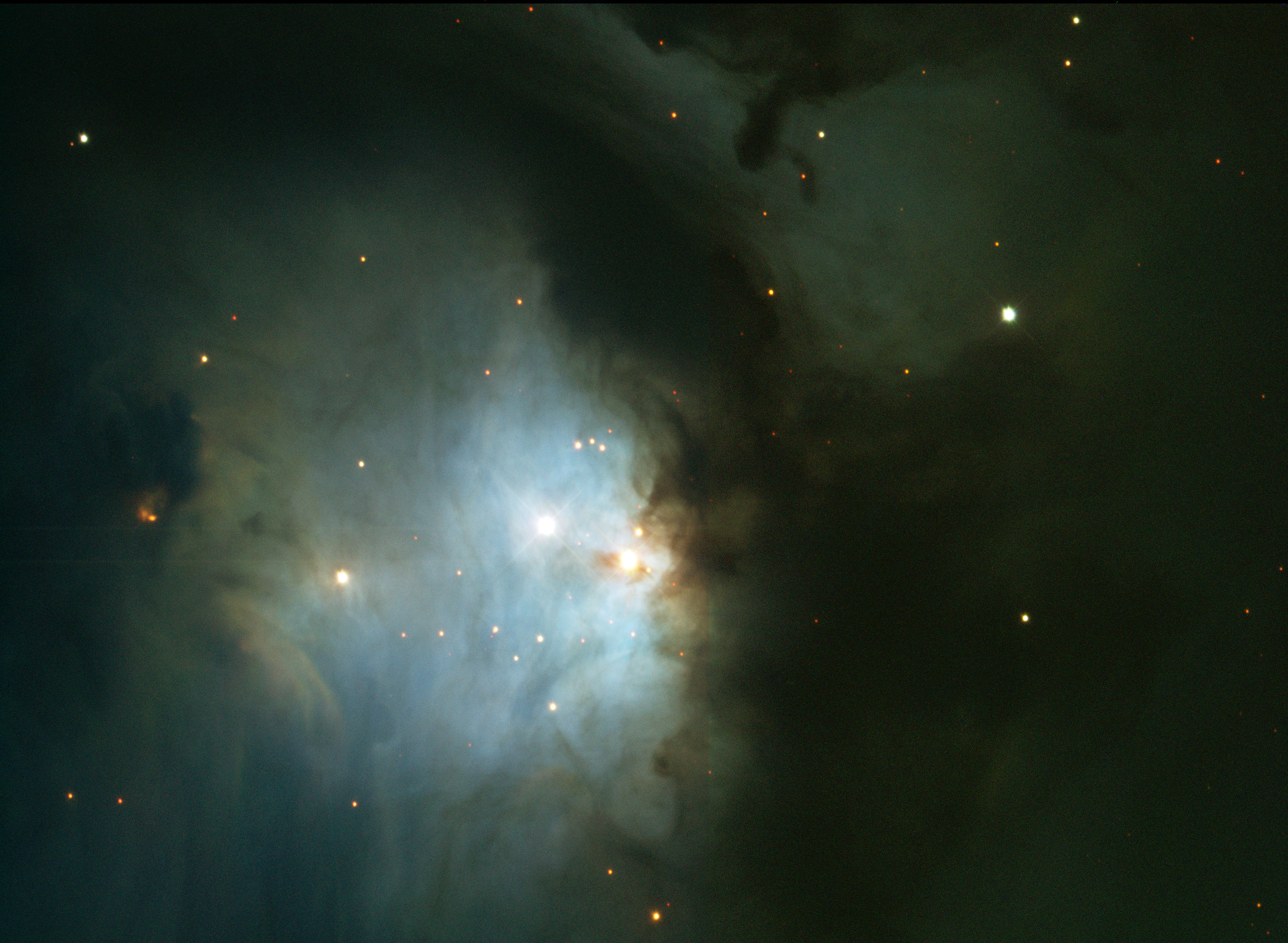
SDSS image of Messier 78.

== See also ==
- List of Messier objects
