= Reflection nebula =

Clouds of interstellar dust which reflect the light of nearby stars

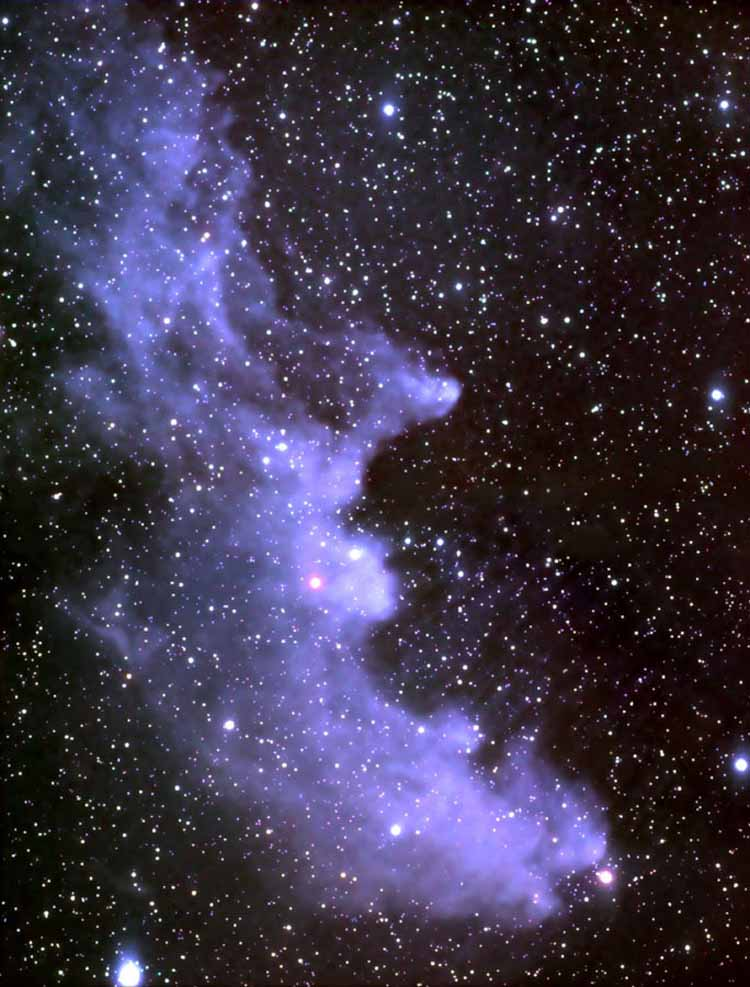
The Witch Head reflection nebula (IC2118), about 900 light years from Earth, is associated with the bright star Rigel in the constellation Orion. The nebula glows primarily by light reflected from Rigel, located just outside the top right corner of the image. Fine dust in the nebula reflects the light. The blue color is caused not only by Rigel's blue color but because the dust grains reflect blue light more efficiently than red.

In astronomy, reflection nebulae are clouds of interstellar dust which might reflect the light of a nearby star or stars. The energy from the nearby stars is insufficient to ionize the gas of the nebula to create an emission nebula, but is sufficient to make the dust visible via scattering effects. Thus, the frequency spectrum shown by reflection nebulae is similar to that of the illuminating stars. Among the microscopic particles responsible for the scattering are carbon compounds (e. g. diamond dust) and compounds of other elements such as iron and nickel. The latter two are often aligned with the galactic magnetic field and cause the scattered light to be slightly polarized.

== Discovery ==
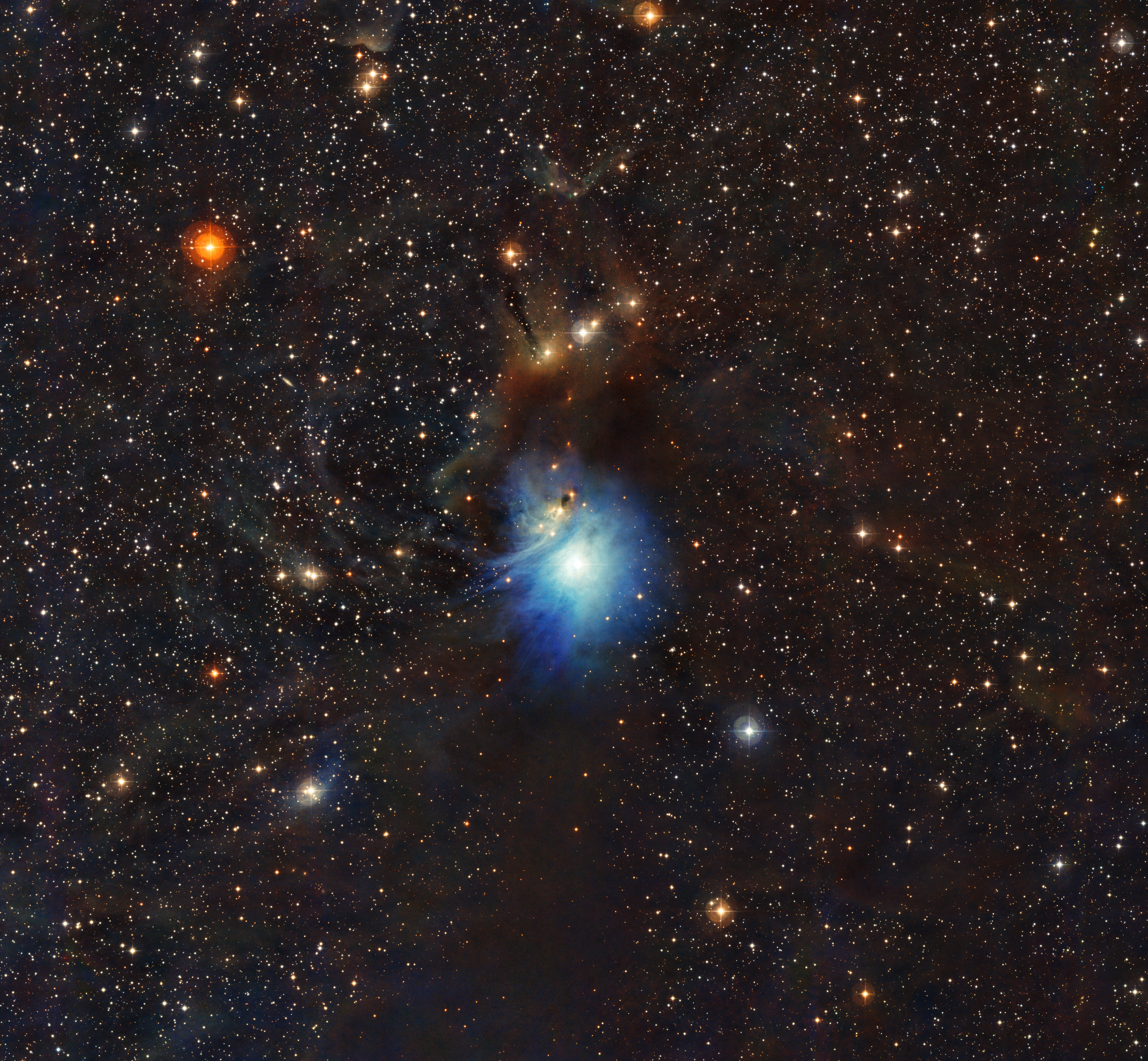
Reflection nebula IC 2631.

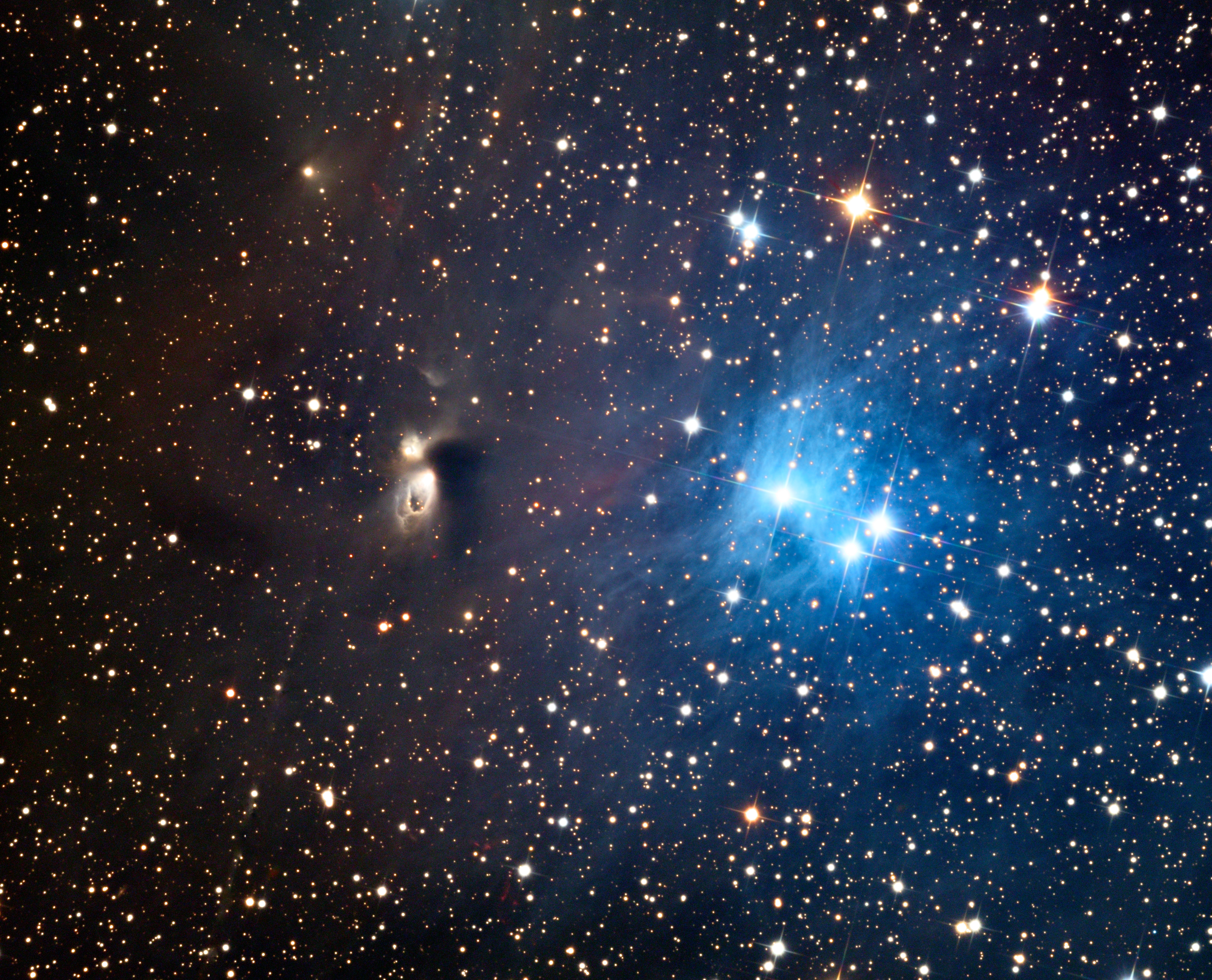
Reflection nebula vdB1

Analyzing the spectrum of the nebula associated with the star Merope in the Pleiades, Vesto Slipher concluded in 1912 that the source of its light is most likely the star itself, and that the nebula reflects light from the star (and that of the star Alcyone). Calculations by Ejnar Hertzsprung in 1913 lend credence to that hypothesis. Edwin Hubble further distinguished between the emission and reflection nebulae in 1922.

Reflection nebula are usually blue because the scattering is more efficient for blue light than red (this is the same scattering process that gives us blue skies and red sunsets).

Reflection nebulae and emission nebulae are often seen together and are sometimes both referred to as diffuse nebulae.

Some 500 reflection nebulae are known. A blue reflection nebula can also be seen in the same area of the sky as the Trifid Nebula. The supergiant star Antares, which is very red (spectral class M1), is surrounded by a large, yellow reflection nebula.

Reflection nebulae may also be the site of star formation.

== Luminosity law ==
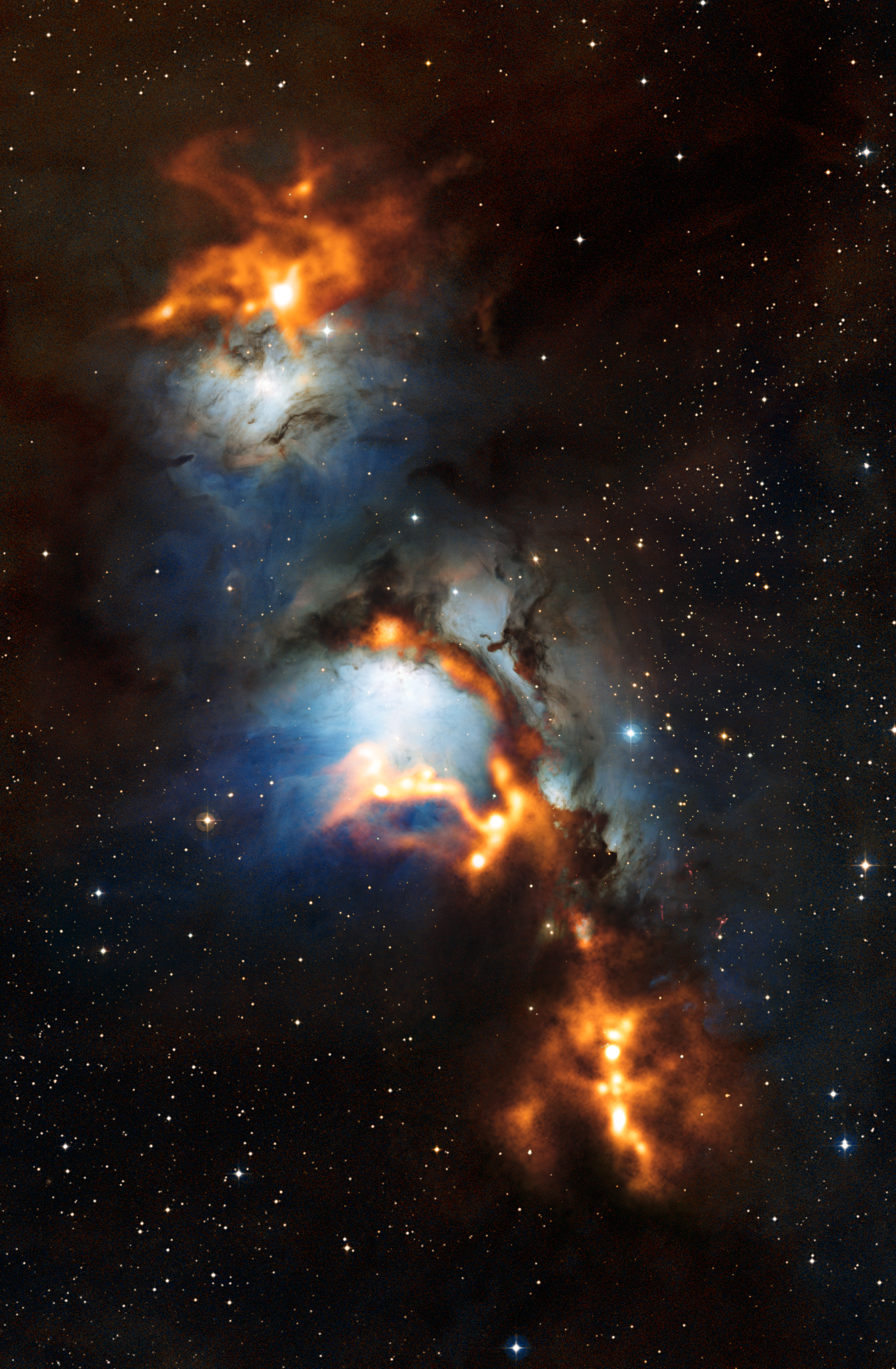
Cosmic dust clouds in Messier 78.

In 1922, Edwin Hubble published the result of his investigations on bright nebulae. One part of this work is the Hubble luminosity law for reflection nebulae, which makes a relationship between the angular size (R) of the nebula and the apparent magnitude (m) of the associated star:

5 log(R) = −m + k

where k is a constant that depends on the sensitivity of the measurement.

== See also ==
- Variable nebula
- List of reflected light sources
- V1647 Orionis

== Bibliography ==
- James B. Kaler (1997). Cosmic Clouds -- Birth, Death, and Recycling in the Galaxy, Scientific American Library, Freeman, New York, 1998.
