= List of diffuse nebulae =

This is a list of diffuse nebulae outside and inside the milky way galaxy in alphabetical order. Most nebulae are diffuse, meaning that they do not have well-defined boundaries. Types of diffuse nebulae include emission nebulae and reflection nebulae.

== List ==
Image	Type	Name	NGC	Other designation	Discovery date	Distance (light-year)	Apparent magnitude (visual)	Constellation	Radius (light-year)
	Reflection nebula	Angel Nebula	NGC 2170		1784	2707 (approx.)		Monoceros	
	H II region	Barnard's Loop		Sh 2-276	1889	1400 (approx.)	5	Orion	150 (approx.)
	Reflection nebula	Barnard's Merope Nebula		IC 349	1890	440	13	Taurus	
	Reflection nebula			Bernes 149	1971	600		Lupus	
	Reflection nebula	Blue Horsehead Nebula		IC 4592	1895	400		Scorpius	40
	Protoplanetary reflection nebula	Boomerang Nebula			1976	5000 (approx.)		Centaurus	1
	H II region	Bubble Nebula	NGC 7635	Caldwell 11	1787	11000 (approx.)	10	Cassiopeia	
	H II region	Bubble Nebula (top)	NGC 6822	Hubble 1925 I	1925	1630000	15	Sagittarius	5
	Emission nebula	California Nebula	NGC 1499	Sh 2-220	1884	1300 (approx.)	6.0	Perseus	22
	Emission nebula	Carina Nebula	NGC 3372	Caldwell 92	1752	8500	1.0	Carina	230 (approx.)
	Emission nebula	Cat's Paw Nebula	NGC 6334	Gum 64	1837	4370 (approx.)		Scorpius	35 (approx.)
	H II region	Cave Nebula		Sh 2-155	1959	2400 (approx.)	7.7	Cepheus	35
	Reflection nebula	Chamaeleon Cloud		IC 2631	1900	630 (approx.)		Chamaeleon	
	Emission nebula	Clamshell Nebula		Sh 2-119	1950s	2200 (approx.)		Cygnus	
	Emission nebula	Cocoon Nebula		IC 5146	1899	2500 (approx.)	7.2	Cygnus	7.5
	H II region	Cone Nebula			1785	2700		Monoceros	4
	Emission nebula	Crescent Nebula	NGC 6888	Caldwell 27	1792	5000	7.4	Cygnus	
	H II region	De Mairan's Nebula	NGC 1982	Messier 43	1731?	1300	9.0	Orion	
	Gaseous Nebula	Double Helix Nebula			2005	25000 (approx.)		Ophiuchus	
	Emission nebula	Dragonfish Nebula		GAL 298.4-00.4	2010	32000		Crux	225
	Reflection nebula	Dreyer's Nebula		IC 447 or IC 2169	1894	2480		Monoceros	0.25 x 0.9
	H II region	Eagle Nebula	NGC 6611	Messier 16	1745	5700 (approx.)	6.4	Serpens	70 x 55
	Emission nebula	Elephant's Trunk Nebula		IC 1396A	1983	2400		Cepheus	
	Reflection nebula	Embryo Nebula or Phantom Tiara Nebula		Cederbald 16	1855	976 (approx.)	5.6	Perseus	
	Emission nebula	Flame Nebula	NGC 2024	Sh 2-277	1786	1350	10	Orion	6
	Emission nebula	Fish Head Nebula	NGC 896	IC 1796	1890	6000 (approx.)		Cassiopeia	
	Emission nebula	Firebird Nebula	NGC 6188		1826	4000		Ara	300
	Reflection nebula	Flaming Star Nebula		IC 405		1500	6.0?	Auriga	2.5
	Reflection nebula	Flower Bud Nebula or Small Cluster Nebula	NGC 7129	Collinder 441	1794	3300	11.5	Cepheus	3
	H II region	Fox Fur Nebula		Sh 2-273	1785	2700		Monoceros	
	Reflection nebula	Fly Nebula	NGC 1931		1793	7500 (approx.)	10.1	Auriga	
	H II region	Fossil Footprint Nebula	NGC 1491	Sh 2-206	1790	9800 (approx.)	8.5	Perseus	
	Emission nebula	Gamma Cygni Nebula or Sadr Region		IC 1318	1893	2000-5000		Cygnus	
	Reflection nebula	Ghost Nebula		Sh 2-136	1959	1470		Cepheus	
	Emission nebula	Ghost Head Nebula	NGC 2080		1834	160000		Dorado	
	Emission nebula	Gum Nebula		Gum 12	1939	1470	12	Vela	
	Open cluster	Gabriela Mistral Nebula	NGC 3324	Collinder 225	1826	9100		Carina	15
	Reflection nebula	Gyulbudaghian's Nebula		GM 1-29	1977	1109	13.4-18.5	Cepheus	
	H II region	Heart Nebula	NGC 896	Westerhout 4	1787	7000	6.5	Cassiopeia	165
	Variable nebula	Hind's Variable Nebula	NGC 1555	Sh 2-238	1852	400		Taurus	2
	Emission nebula	Homunculus Nebula			1944	7500	6.21	Carina	0.29
	Dark nebula	Horsehead Nebula		Barnard 33	1888	1375 (approx.)	6.8	Orion	3.5
	Variable nebula	Hubble's Variable Nebula		Caldwell 46	1783	2500	9.0	Monoceros	0.5 (approx.)
	Reflection nebula			IC 444	1888-1894	5000 (approx.)	7.03	Gemini	
	Emission nebula			IC 1396	1893	2400		Cepheus	
	H II region			IC 2177		3650	15.23	Monoceros	
	Reflection nebula	Iris Nebula	NGC 7023	Caldwell 4	1794	1300	6.8	Cepheus	3
	H II region	Lagoon Nebula	NGC 6523	Messier 8	1654	4100	4,6	Sagittarius	55 x 20
	H II region			LH 95		163000 (approx.)	11.10	Dorado	
	Emission nebula			LHA 120-N 55	1956	160000		Dorado	
	Open cluster	Little Cocoon Nebula	NGC 1624	Sh 2-212	1790	20000 (approx.)	11.8	Perseus	
	Emission nebula	Little Rosette Nebula		Sh 2-170	1950s	7500	6.5 (approx.)	Cassiopeia	
	Variable nebula	McNeil's Nebula		EQ J054614-00058	2004	1600	15-16	Orion	
	Reflection nebula	Merope Nebula	NGC 1435		1859	440	13	Taurus	2
	Reflection nebula		NGC 2068	Messier 78	1780	1350	8.3	Orion	5
	H II region	Monkey Head Nebula	NGC 2174		1877	6400	6.8	Orion	
	Emission nebula			N11	1956	160000		Dorado	500
	Emission nebula			N41	1956	170000 (approx.)		Dorado	50 (approx.)
	Emission nebula			N44	1956	160000 (approx.)		Dorado	500 (approx.)
	H II region			N119	1956	160000	5.60	Dorado	
	Emission nebula		NGC 248	LHA 115-N 13	1834	200000		Tucana	30 x 10
	Emission nebula		NGC 249 (right)		1826	200000 (approx.)	15.0	Tucana	
	Emission nebula		NGC 261 (left)		1826	200000 (approx.)		Tucana	
	Open cluster		NGC 267		1836	200000 (approx.)		Tucana	
	H II region		NGC 346	N 66	1826	210000		Tucana	
	Open cluster		NGC 371	Hodge 53	1826	200000		Tucana	
	H II region		NGC 588		1861	2380000 (approx.)		Triangulum	
	H II region		NGC 595		1864	3000000		Triangulum	440 (approx.)
	H II region		NGC 604		1784	2700000	14.0	Triangulum	760
	H II region		NGC 1714		1834	163000	11.61	Dorado	
	Reflection nebula		NGC 1788		1786	1300	9.0	Orion	
	Reflection nebula		NGC 1985	2MASS J05374779+3159200	1790	5870	12.8	Auriga	
	Emission nebula		NGC 2014		1826	163000		Dorado	
	Reflection nebula		NGC 2023	LBN 954	1785	1300		Orion	
	Reflection nebula		NGC 2064	LBN 1627	1864	1600	8.2	Orion	
	Reflection nebula		NGC 2067	DG 79	1876	1350		Orion	
	Reflection nebula		NGC 2071	LBN 938	1784	1300		Orion	
	H II region		NGC 3603	RCW 57	1847	20000	9.1	Carina	
	Star-forming region		NGC 6559	LBN 28	1826	5000		Sagittarius	
	Reflection nebula		NGC 6589 (right)	IC 4690	1867	5900 (approx.)		Sagittarius	
	Reflection nebula		NGC 6590 (left)	IC 4700	1830	5900 (approx.)		Sagittarius	
	Reflection nebula		NGC 6729	Caldwell 68	1861	420 (approx.)		Corona Australis	
	Reflection nebula		NGC 6914	LBN 274	1881	6000		Cygnus	
	Diffuse nebula		NGC 7538	Sh 158		9100		Cepheus	
	H II region	Northern Trifid Nebula	NGC 1579	Sh 2-222	1788	2000 (approx.)		Perseus	4
	H II region	North America Nebula	NGC 7000	Caldwell 20	1786	2590	4	Cygnus	45
	H II region	Omega Nebula	NGC 6618	Messier 17	1745	5000-6000 (approx.)	6.0	Sagittarius	11
	Diffuse nebula	Orion Nebula	NGC 1976	Messier 42	1610	1267.0	4.0	Orion	13
	H II region	Pacman Nebula	NGC 281	IC 11	1883	9500	7.4	Cassiopeia	48
	H II region	Pelican Nebula		IC 5070	1786	1800		Cygnus	
	Diffuse nebula	Pencil Nebula	NGC 2736		1835	815	12.0?	Vela	5.0 (approx.)
	H II region	Pistol Nebula			1980s	25000		Sagittarius	2.1
	H II region	Propeller Nebula			1950s	4600 (approx.)		Cygnus	
	Emission nebula	Question Mark Nebula	NGC 7822	Sh 2-171	1829	2900		Cepheus	75
	Emission nebula	Ring Nebula (bottom)	NGC 6822	Hubble 1925 III	1925	1630000	14.5 (approx.)	Sagittarius	419 (approx.)
	H II region	Rosette Nebula		Caldwell 49	1690	5200	9.0	Monoceros	65
	H II region	Running Chicken Nebula		IC 2944	1950	6500	4.5	Centaurus	71
	H II region	Running Man Nebula	NGC 1977, 1973, and 1975	Sh 2-279	1786	1500	7.0	Orion	7.5 (approx.
	H II region			Sh 2-185	1959	10500 (approx.)		Cassiopeia	
	H II region	Soul Nebula		Westerhout 5	1787	7500		Cassiopeia	165
	Emission nebula	Statue of Liberty Nebula	NGC 3576	Gum 38A	1834	7800 to 9,800 (approx.)		Carina	
	Emission nebula	Tadpole Nebula		IC 410	1892	12361 (approx.)		Auriga	
	H II region	Tarantula Nebula	NGC 2070	30 Doradus	1751	160000 (approx.)	8	Dorado	931
	Reflection nebula	Toby Jug Nebula		IC 2220	1900	1200		Carina	
	H II region	Trifid Nebula	NGC 6514	Messier 20	1764	4100	6.3	Sagittarius	21
	Reflection nebula	The Cosmic Keyhole	NGC 1999		1785	1500		Orion	0.3 (approx.)
	H II region	Twiddlebug Nebula		IC 1284	1892	5800	7.7	Sagittarius	34
	Reflection nebula			VdB 1	1960	1600		Cassiopeia	
	Reflection nebula			VdB 24	1966	1141		Perseus	
	Reflection nebula			VdB 158	1966	1435		Andromeda	
	H II region	War and Peace Nebula or Lobster Nebula	NGC 6357	RCW 131	1837	5900 (approx.)		Scorpius	
	Reflection nebula	Witch Head Nebula		IC 2118	1786	1000 (approx.)	13	Eridanus	
	H II region	Wreath Nebula		Barnard 3	1919?	1000		Perseus	22

== See also ==
- Lists of astronomical objects
- List of nebulae
