= Clamshell Nebula =

Emission nebula

Emission nebula
- H II region
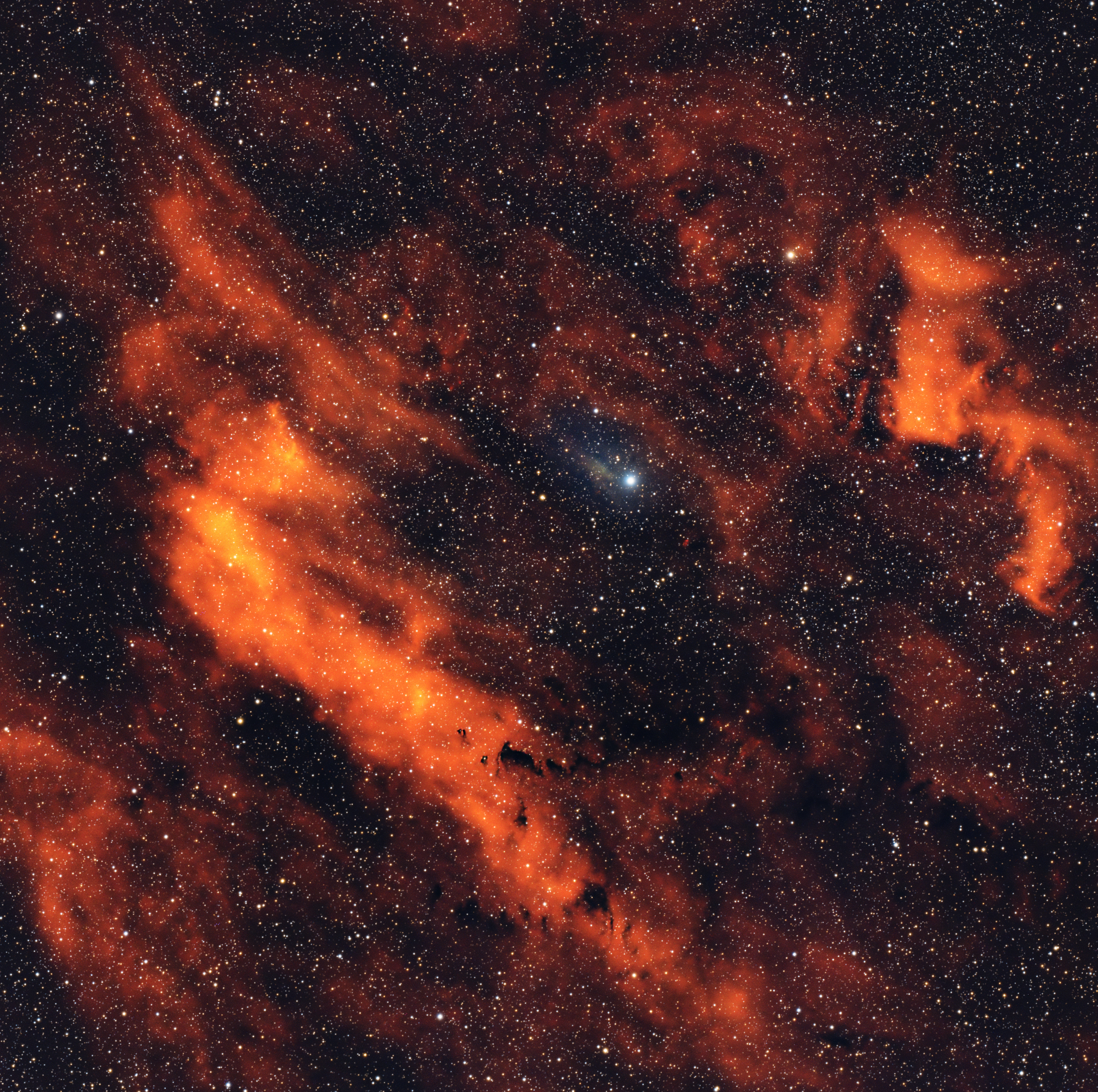
- Image of Clamshell Nebula

Observation data: epoch
- Right ascension: 21h 18m 30s
- Declination: +43° 56' 00"
- Distance: ~2,200 ly
- Apparent diameter: 3°
- Constellation: Cygnus
- Designations: Sh 2-119, LBN 391, [GS55] 240

The Clamshell Nebula (also known as Sh 2-119) is an emission nebula and star-forming region located in the constellation Cygnus.

The Clamshell Nebula was discovered in the early 1950s by Grigory Abramovich Shajn and Vera Fedorovna Gaze while conducting a photographic survey, and they named it Gaze+Shajn [GS55] 240. Stewart Sharpless would survey the region of the sky in more detail in 1959, revealing that the nebula was much more extensive than originally though. He included it in his sharpless catalog, giving it the designation Sh 2-119.

The nebula surrounds blue giant 68 Cygni. The nebula contains multiple dust lanes and bok globules. 68 Cygni is the primary source of ionization within the nebula. The structure of the nebula is that of a Strömgren sphere, and is divided into an eastern and western section, with 68 Cygni between the two. These two sections are the reason for the 'clamshell' name. It was originally proposed that this nebula was formed from 68 Cygni's stellar wind. Instead, the stellar wind is likely due to the star's high velocity through space, forming a bow shock. The planetary nebula PK 87-3.1 is located within the nebula. and open cluster NGC 7044 is located nearby.
