= N41 =

N41 may refer to:

- N41 (Long Island bus)
- N41 (nebula), in the Large Magellanic Cloud
- HMS Regent (N41), a submarine of the Royal Navy
- London Buses route N41
- Nebraska Highway 41, in the United States
- Waterbury Airport (Connecticut), in Plymouth, Connecticut, United States
