= IC 417 =

Emmission nebula in the constellation Auriga

Nebula
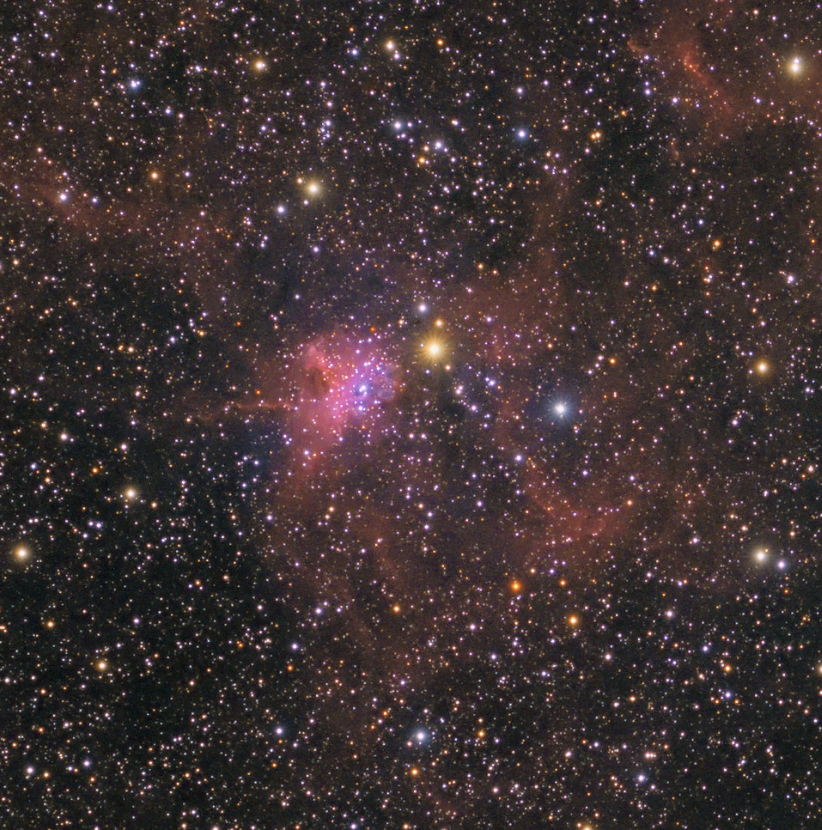

Observation data: epoch
- Right ascension: 5^{h} 28^{m} 5.9^{s}
- Declination: +34° 25′ 26″
- Distance: 7100 ly
- Apparent diameter: 13' x 10'
- Constellation: Auriga
- Designations: CED 46, LBN 804, Sh 2-234

IC 417, also known as the Spider Nebula, is an emission nebula in Auriga. It is part of the Aur OB2 association, located nearby to NGC 1931. It is located on the near side of the Perseus Arm of the Milky Way galaxy.

It has an estimated age of 10 million years. The nebula is home to 710 potential young stellar objects. It is thought that it truly contains hundreds of thousands of newly-formed stars.

It was discovered by Max Wolf on 25 September, 1892. IC 417 is visually nearby to the open cluster Stock 8, which it surrounds.
