= Toby Jug (disambiguation) =

A Toby Jug is a type of jug.

Toby Jug may also refer to:

- Toby Jug Nebula, a star system
- Lord Toby Jug (1965–2019), British politician

== See also ==
- Toby (disambiguation)
