= NGC 249 =

Emission nebula in the constellation Tucana

Emission nebula
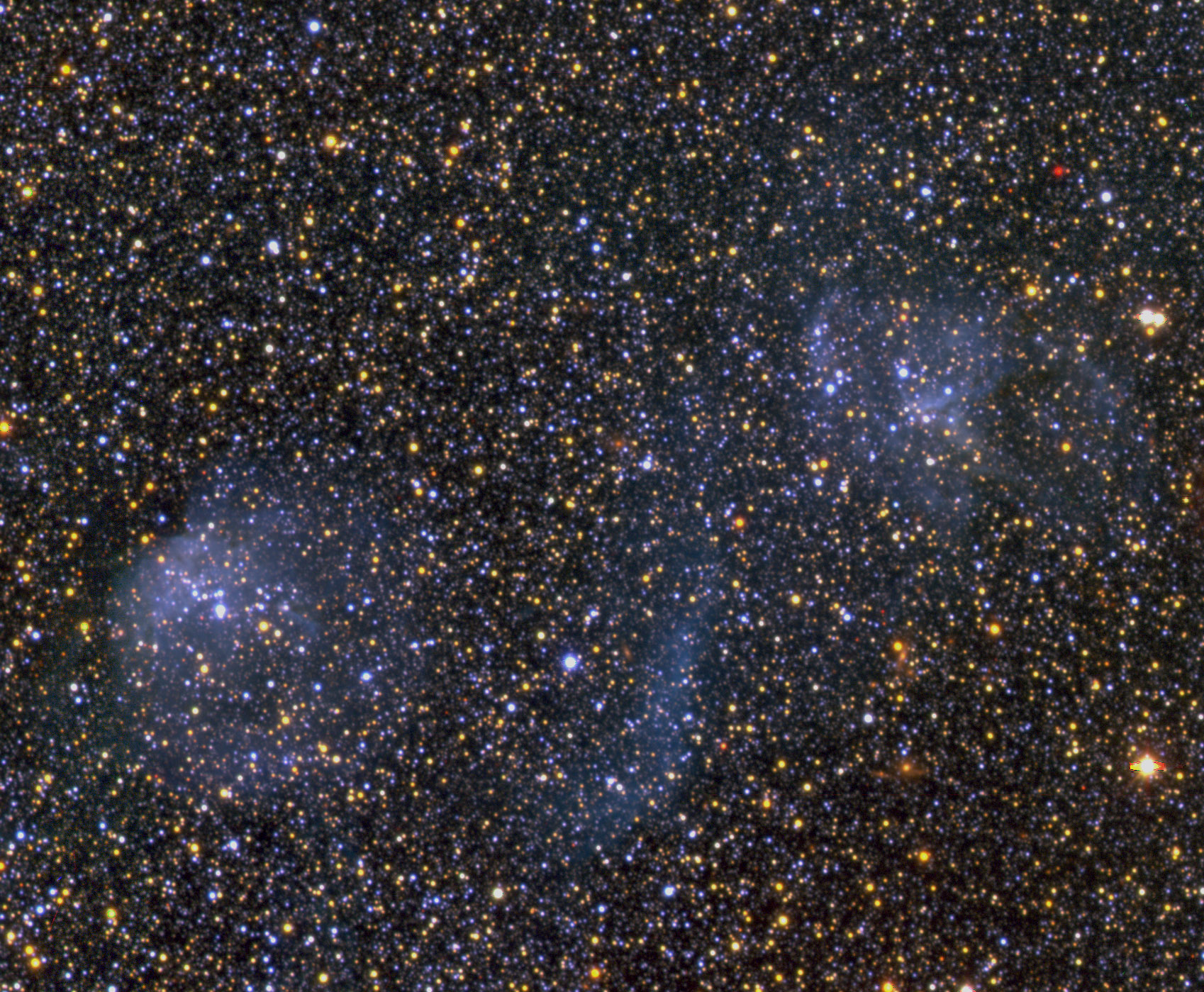
- NGC 249 (right) and NGC 261 (left) with DECam

Observation data: J2000 epoch
- Right ascension: 00^{h} 45^{m} 10.9^{s}
- Declination: −73° 04′ 17″
- Apparent magnitude (V): 15.0
- Apparent dimensions (V): 1.10′ × 0.70′
- Constellation: Tucana

NGC 249 is an emission nebula in the constellation Tucana. It was discovered on 5 September 1826 by the astronomer James Dunlop.

== See also ==
- List of NGC objects (1-1000)
