= Propeller Nebula =

Emission nebula in Cygnus

Emission nebula
- H II region
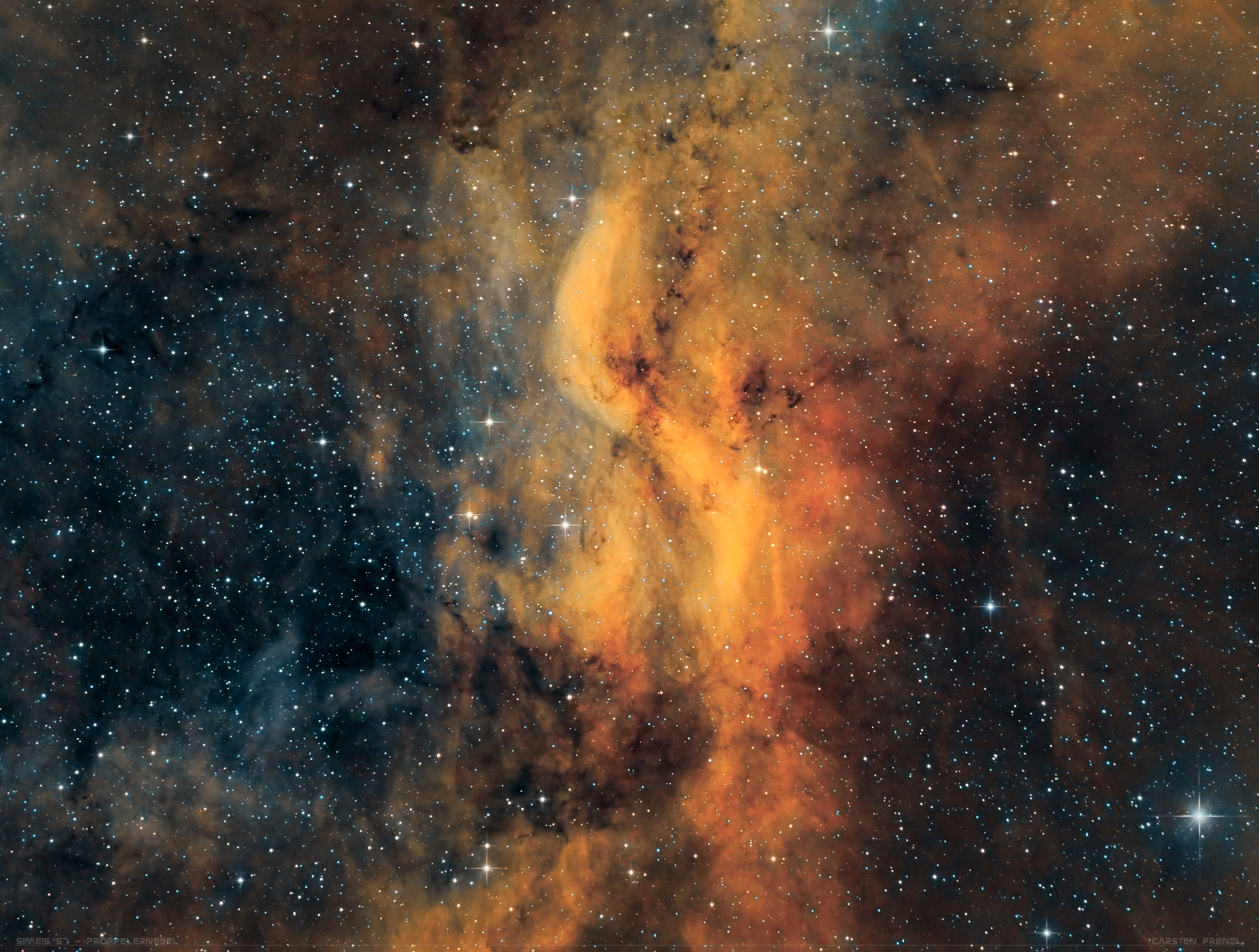
- Image of Propeller Nebula

Observation data: epoch
- Right ascension: 20h 16m 17s
- Declination: +43° 44' 18"
- Distance: ~4,600 (Note: The distance to the nebula is not known, however 4,600 light years is the distance to the greater Sadr region, and is the best estimate currently available. Other estimates have put it as far away as 5,500 ly.) ly

Physical characteristics
- Dimensions: 25' x 12'
- Designations: Garden Sprinkler Nebula, Simeis 57, HS 191, GAL 80.3+4.8

The Propeller Nebula (also known as Simeis 57) is an emission nebula in Cygnus. It is a bright section of the much larger Sadr region. It is located 4° to the northwest of Sadr.

== Observational history ==
The nebula was discovered by Grigory Shajn and Vera Gaze in the early 1950s at the Simeis Observatory. The name of the nebula comes from the central region's similar appearance to the shape of a two blade propeller.

The nebula is too dim to be seen with the naked eye, except under optimal conditions through a large telescope, and probably also with a filter.

== Structure ==
In 1969, the nebula was studied and divided into three when included in the DWB catalogue. DWB 111 for the southern propeller blade, DWB 119 for the norther propeller blade, and DWB 118 for the remainder of the nebula. The source of the nebula's ionization remains uncertain. The origin of the titular 'propeller' structure is also unknown. There are no embedded stars imbedded within the nebula, nor are the any in its immediate vicinity. It is most likely that the binary star system WR 140, located 25 parsecs away from the nebula, are the source for the ionization, although this is not confirmed.

The nebula is brightest in Hydrogen-Alpha, and also visible, though more weak, in Sulphur and Oxygen emissions.
