= NGC 248 =

Emission nebula in the constellation Tucana

Emission nebula
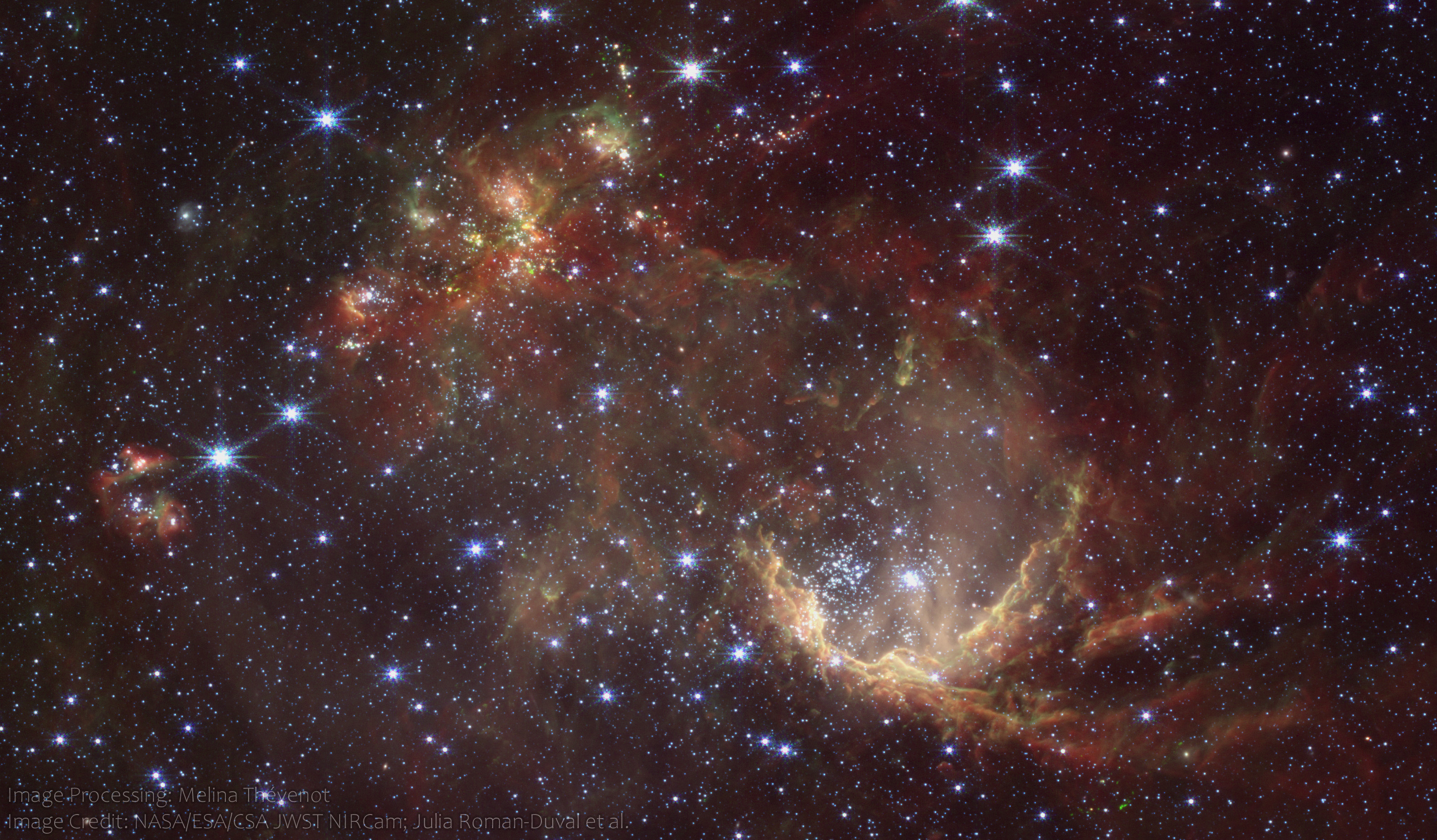
- NGC 248 with JWST NIRCam

Observation data: J2000 epoch
- Right ascension: 00^{h} 45^{m} 24.1^{s}
- Declination: −73° 22′ 44.4″
- Distance: 200,000 ly
- Constellation: Tucana

Physical characteristics
- Radius: 30x10 ly
- Designations: LHA 115-N 13, DEM S 16

NGC 248 is an emission nebula in the constellation Tucana. It is in the Small Magellanic Cloud. It was discovered in 1834 by the astronomer John Frederick William Herschel. NGC 248 is about 60 light-years long and 20 light-years wide.

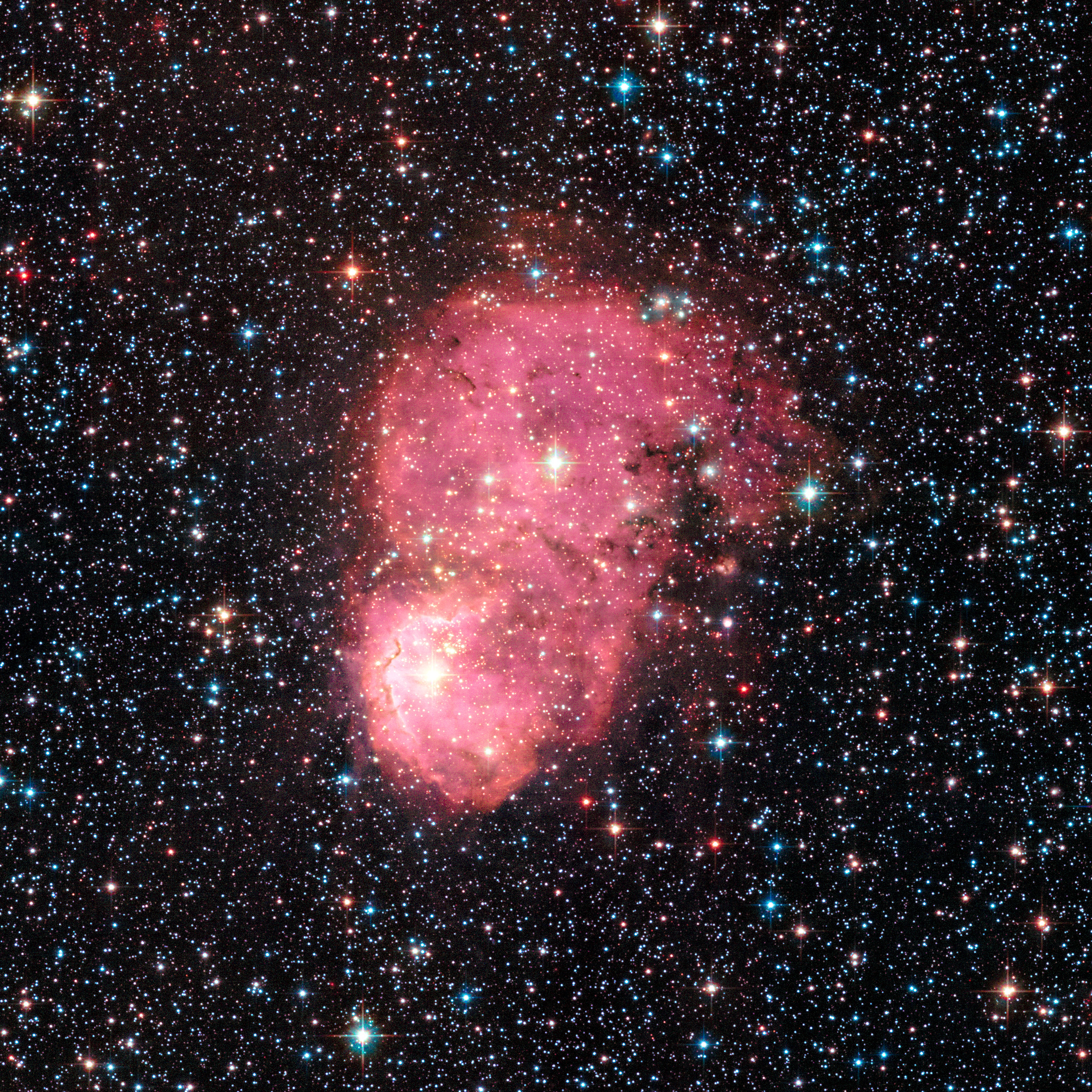
NGC 248 taken as part of a Hubble survey called the Small Magellanic cloud Investigation of Dust and Gas Evolution (SMIDGE).

== See also ==
- List of NGC objects
