= NGC 1714 =

Emission nebula in Dorado

Emission nebula
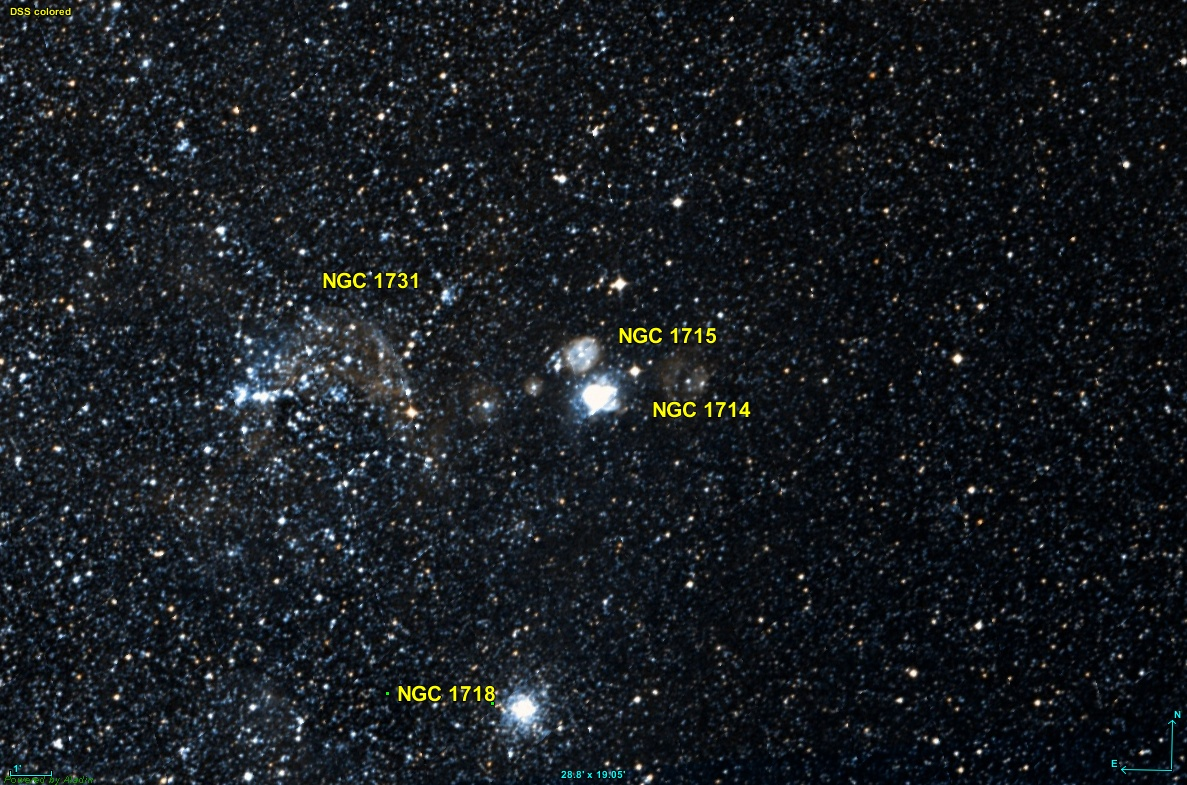

Observation data: J2000 epoch
- Right ascension: 04^{h} 52^{m}
- Declination: ±66° 55′
- Apparent magnitude (V): 11.61
- Apparent dimensions (V): 1.1 arcmin
- Constellation: Dorado

NGC 1714 is an emission nebula in the constellation of Dorado. It is located in the Large Magellanic Cloud and was discovered by John Herschel on 2 November 1834. A study investigating the chemical composition of HII regions in the Large Magellanic Cloud was conducted in it, finding a larger deuterium density than previously thought, leading to (with current knowledge) larger than accepted age of the universe. Candidates for planetary nebula have also been found in the vicinity of NGC 1714.
