= PV Cephei =

Star in the constellation Cepheus

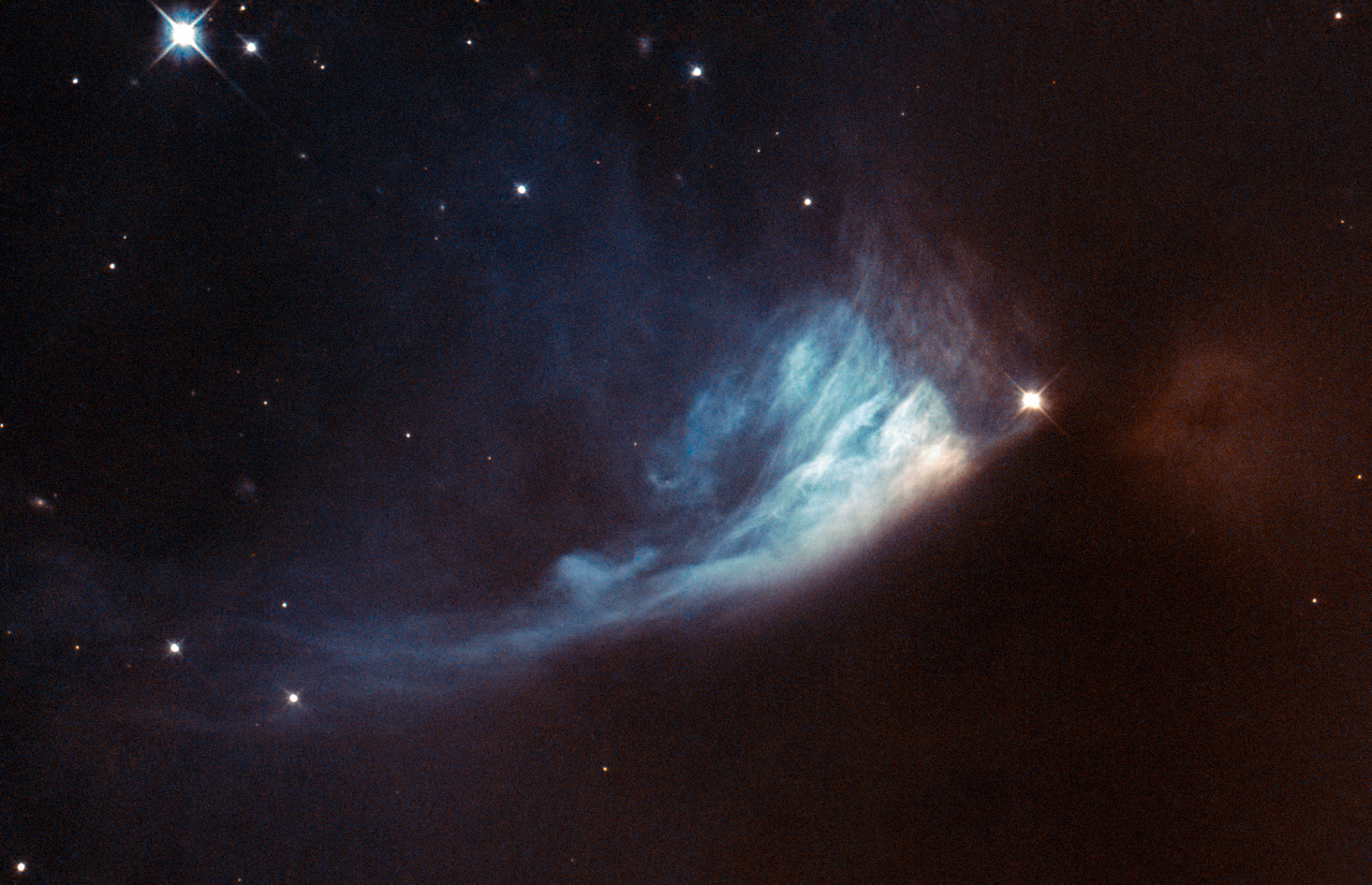
- PV Cep is the bright spot located at the edge of Gyulbudaghian’s Nebula; Credit: ESA/Hubble & NASA. Acknowledgement: Alexey Romashin

Observation data Epoch J2000 Equinox J2000
- Constellation: Cepheus
- Right ascension: 20^{h} 45^{m} 53.954^{s}
- Declination: +67° 57′ 38.68″
- Apparent magnitude (V): 14.58 - 18.08

Characteristics
- Spectral type: A5Ve
- Apparent magnitude (G): 13.87±0.02
- Variable type: T Tau

Astrometry
Proper motion (μ)	RA: 8.108±0.057 mas/yr Dec.: −2.108±0.054 mas/yr
Parallax (π)	2.8048±0.0392 mas
Distance	1,160 ± 20 ly (357 ± 5 pc)

Details
Mass	2.6 M_{☉}
Radius	2.9 R_{☉}
Luminosity	1 - 100 L_{☉}
Temperature	8,150 K
Age	<1 Myr

Database references
SIMBAD	data

PV Cephei is a variable star of Orion type located in the constellation of Cepheus at a distance of about 1,100 light-years from Earth. In visible light it varies in brightness from magnitude 17 to 19, making it far too faint to be seen by the naked eye.

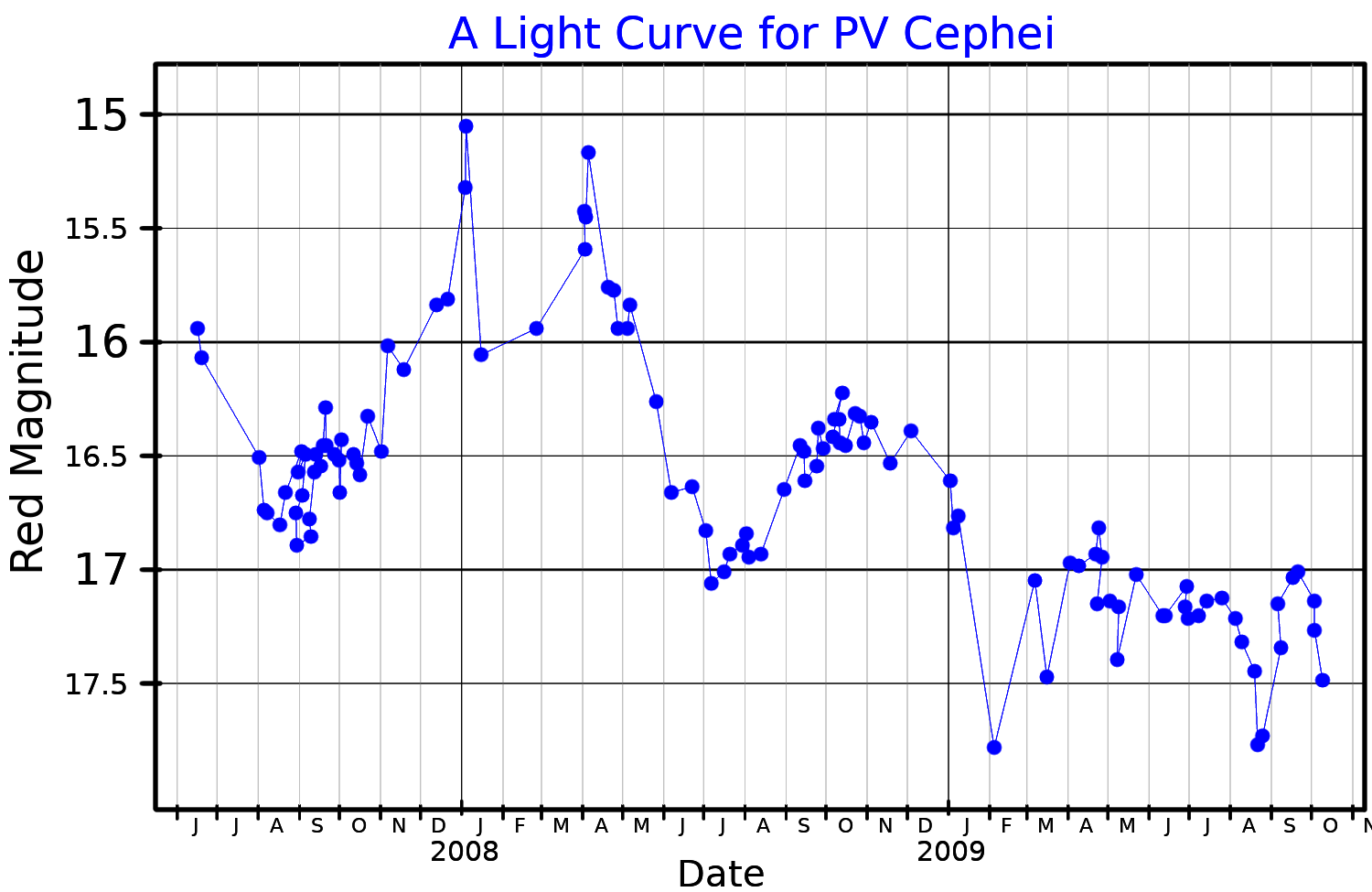
A red band light curve for PV Cephei, adapted from Lorenzetti et al. (2011)

PV Cephei's variability was first detected by Martin Cohen, Leonard Vello Kuhi and Eugene A. Harlan, and was announced in 1977. It was given its variable star designation in 1978. The star is embedded within Gyulbudaghian's Nebula, a reflection nebula. As the star's brightness changes, the nebula's shape changes dramatically.
