= Wreath Nebula =

Nebula in constellation Perseus

Emission nebula
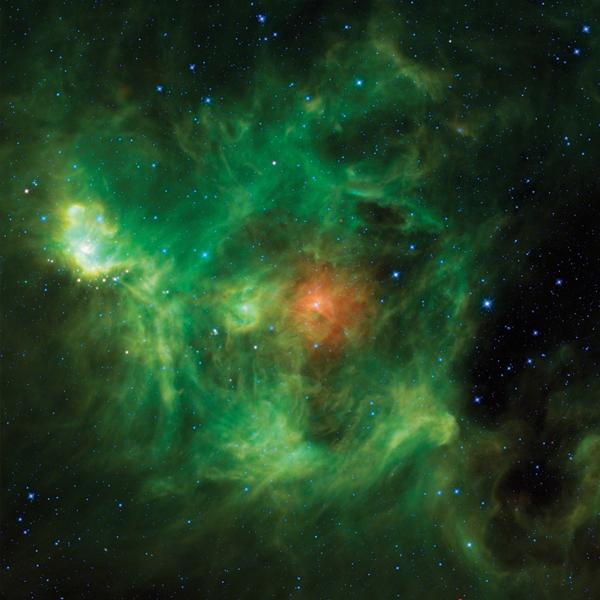
- Barnard 3, the Wreath Nebula.

Observation data: J2000 epoch
- Right ascension: 03^{h} 39^{m} 55.8^{s}
- Declination: +31° 55′ 33″
- Distance: 306.6 pc or 1000 ly
- Constellation: Perseus

Physical characteristics
- Radius: 22 ly
- Designations: Barnard 3

The Wreath Nebula (also known as Barnard 3 or IRAS Ring G159.6-18.5 is an emission nebula and H II region with a radius of about 22 light-years, located about 1,000 light-years away within the Milky Way in the Perseus molecular cloud complex, near the boundary with the constellation of Taurus. Interstellar clouds like these are stellar nurseries, places where new stars are being born.

The green ring is made of tiny particles of warm dust whose composition is very similar to smog. The red cloud in the middle is probably made of dust that is more metallic and cooler than the surrounding regions. The bright star in the middle of the red cloud, called HD 278942, is so luminous that it is likely what is causing most of the surrounding ring to glow. In fact its powerful stellar winds are what cleared out the surrounding warm dust and created the ring-shaped feature in the first place. The bright greenish-yellow region left of center is similar to the ring, though more dense. The bluish-white stars scattered throughout are stars located both in front of, and behind, the nebula.

Regions similar to this nebula are found near the band of the Milky Way in the night sky. The "wreath" is slightly off this band, near the boundary between the constellations of Perseus and Taurus, but at a relatively close distance of only about 1,000 light-years, the cloud is a still part of our Milky Way.

The colors used in this image represent specific wavelengths of infrared light. Blue and cyan (blue-green) represent light emitted at wavelengths of 3.4 and 4.6 microns, which is predominantly from stars. Green and red represent light from 12 and 22 microns, respectively, which is mostly emitted by dust.
