= NGC 6590 =

Reflection nebula in the constellation Sagittarius

Reflection nebula
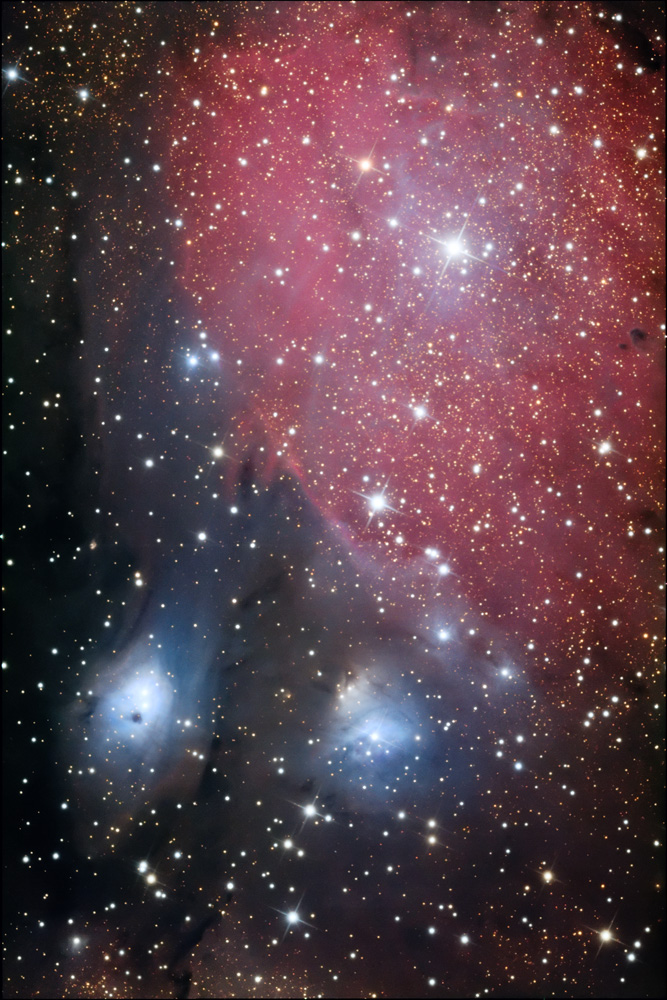
- NGC 6590 (bottom left) with NGC 6589 (bottom center) and IC 1284 (top)

Observation data: J2000.0 epoch
- Right ascension: 18^{h} 17^{m} 05^{s}
- Declination: −19° 51′ 58″
- Constellation: Sagittarius
- Designations: NGC 6595, IC 4700, OCL 31

NGC 6590 is a reflection nebula in the constellation of Sagittarius. This nebula is near the similar reflection nebula NGC 6589. Both nebulas are flanked by red emission nebula IC 1284. NGC 6595 is a duplicate entry of this nebula in the NGC catalog. The nebula was first discovered by John Herschel on July 14, 1830. It was then independently discovered by Lewis Swift on Jul 12, 1885. It was independently discovered for a third and final time by Edward E. Barnard in August 1905.
