= LH 95 =

H II region in the constellation Dorado

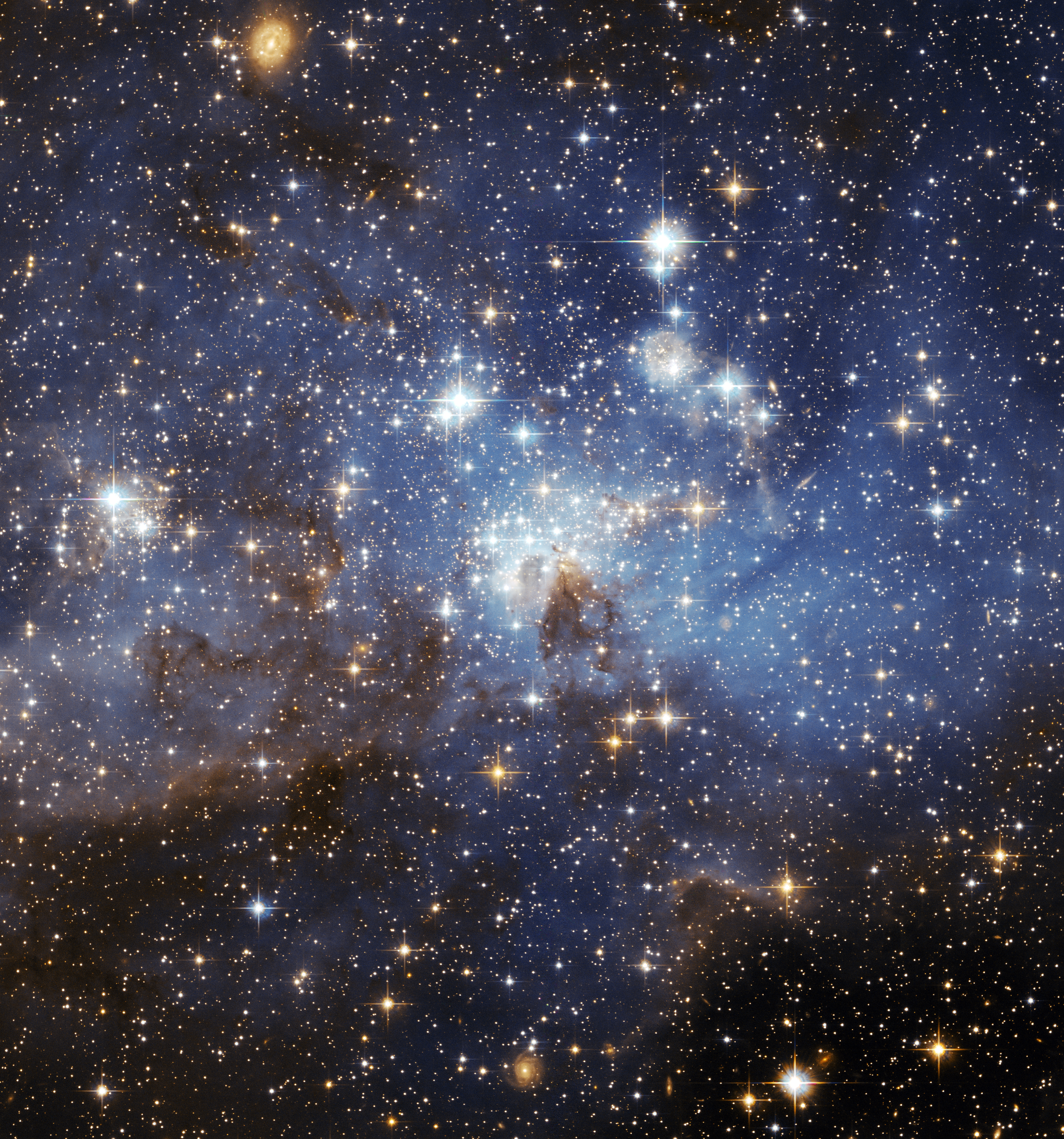
- The stellar nursery LH 95, in the Large Magellanic Cloud; Credit: NASA/ESA

Observation data (J200LHA 120-N 550 epoch)
- Right ascension: 05^{h} 37^{m} 04.32^{s}
- Declination: −66° 22′ 00.7″
- Distance: ~163000 light years (~50000 parsecs (50 kpc))
- Apparent magnitude (V): 11.10
- Apparent dimensions (V): 0.80' x 0.65'

Physical characteristics
- Other designations: LH 95, KMHK 1139, 2MASS J05370431-6622007

Associations
- Constellation: Dorado

LH 95 is a modestly sized stellar nursery in the Large Magellanic Cloud. It is related to the HII-region LHA 120-N 55, that is, a region of hydrogen ionized by the bright stars of LH 95.

Previously only young bright stars were known in this stellar association. Imaging using the Hubble Space Telescope, however, allowed the identification of more than 2,500 pre–main sequence stars with masses down to about 0.3 solar masses, thereby giving a detailed picture of what a typical stellar association in the LMC looks like.

The large sample of low-mass pre–main sequence stars, stars that are currently under formation, in LH 95 allows the construction of the first most complete Initial Mass Function of an extragalactic star forming cluster. The Initial Mass Function of LH 95 does not seem to differ from that typical for the Milky Way.

== See also ==
- Star
- Stellar nurseries
