= Gyulbudaghian's Nebula =

Reflection nebula in the constellation Cepheus

Reflection nebula
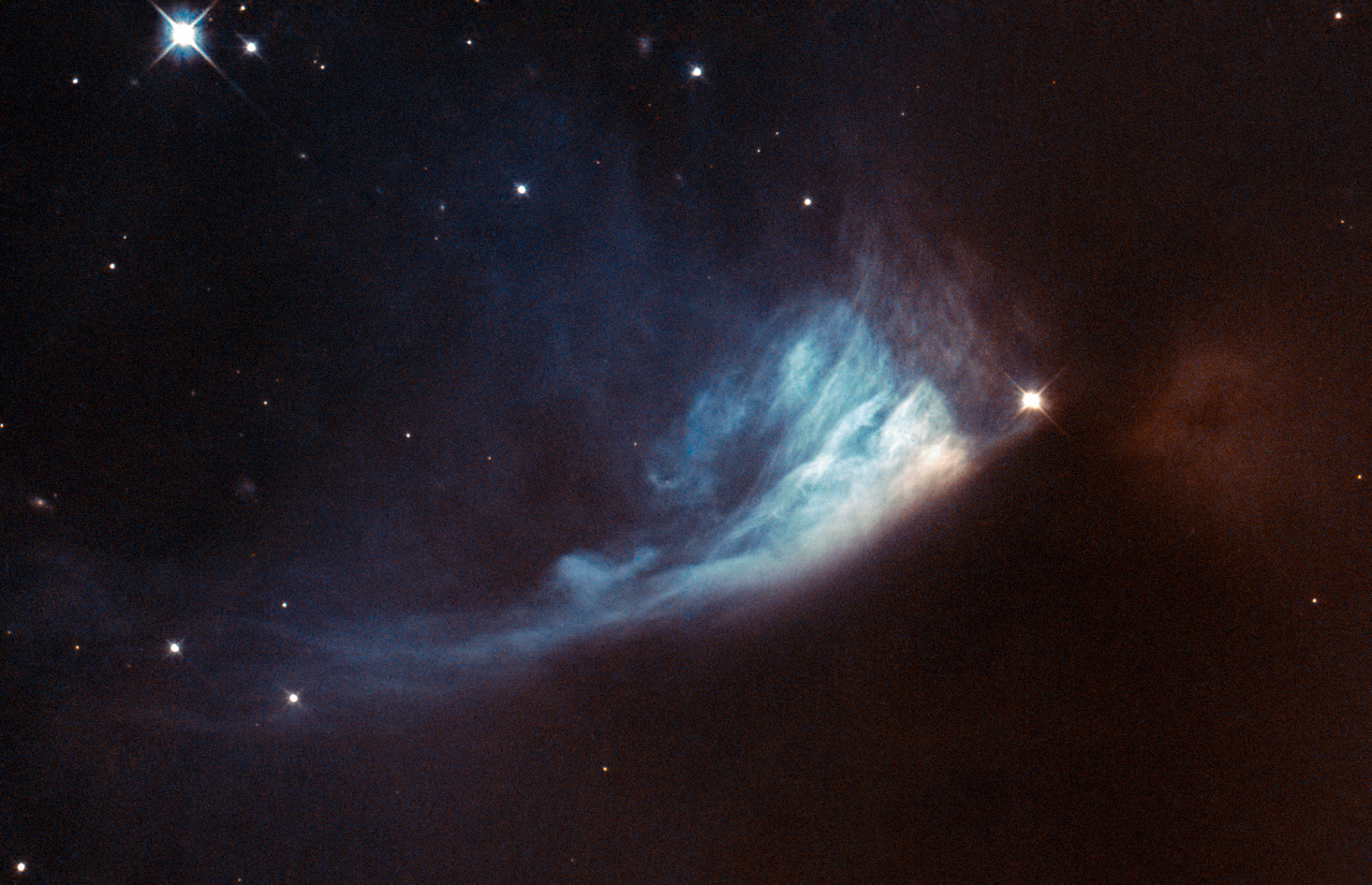
- HST image

Observation data: J2000 epoch
- Right ascension: 20^{h} 45^{m} 54^{s}
- Declination: 67° 57′ 00″
- Distance: 1,109 ly
- Apparent magnitude (V): 13.4 - 18.5
- Apparent dimensions (V): 1.5 × 1.0′
- Constellation: Cepheus
- Designations: GM 1-29

Gyulbudaghian's Nebula (gyool-boo-DAH-ghee-an) is a reflection nebula in the northern constellation Cepheus, located about 1.5 degrees west of the much brighter reflection nebula NGC 7023. The light illuminating it comes from the T Tauri star PV Cephei. It is known for changing its shape dramatically on a timescale of months to years, as the brightness of PV Cephei changes. The nebula, whose magnitude ranges from 13.4 to 18.5, is far too faint to be seen with the naked eye, or even a small telescope. However, because of its changing morphology, it has become a target for observations by advanced amateur astronomers.

Gyulbudaghian's Nebula was discovered in 1977 by Armenian astronomers Armen Gyul'budaghian and Tigran Yu. Magakian at the Byurakan Astrophysical Observatory and separately that same year by Martin Cohen, Leonard Vello Kuhi and Eugene A. Harlan in California. Both groups discovered the nebula on the red Palomar Sky Survey (POSS) plates taken in 1952. Gyul'budaghian's group discovered the nebula's variable nature from followup observations with the 2.6 meter Byurakan reflector, and Cohen's group discovered its variability by comparing the POSS images with images of the region taken over a five-year period at Lick Observatory. It was found that the nebula sometimes appeared as a streak, and at other times it was shaped like a fan with PV Cephei at its tip. Subsequent studies have shown that sometimes the nebula disappears nearly completely.

In 1986 Scarrott et al. reported that Gyulbudaghian's Nebula is either bipolar or biconical. In addition to the fan shaped nebulousity to the north of PV Cephei, seen by earlier observers, they detected a fainter counterlobe south of the star. From polarization measurements they concluded that the bright north lobe is not reflected light, but rather intrinsic emission. The faint southern counterlobe was later found to be quite red; it is brighter in the near-infrared than in visible light and is dimmed by at least 4 magnitudes of extinction in visible light. The streak, when it is visible, coincides with the eastern edge of the fan-shaped nebula.
