= NGC 1931 =

Nebula and open cluster in the constellation Auriga

Reflection nebula
- emission nebula
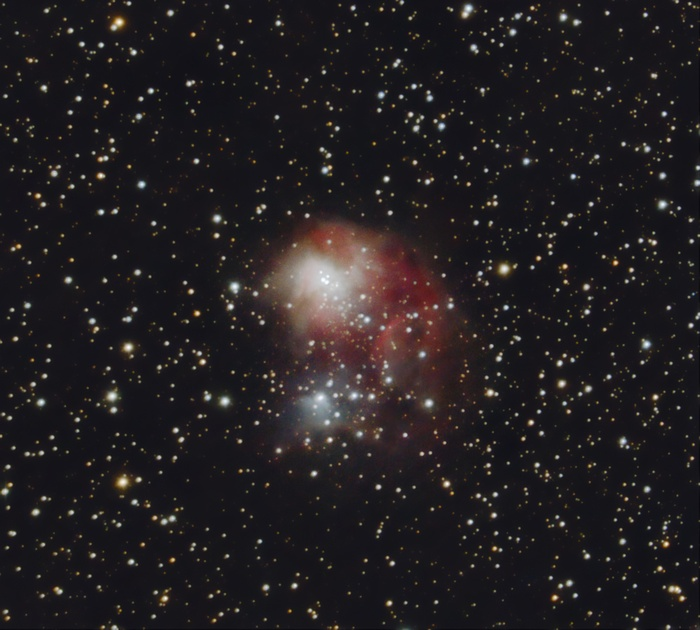
- NGC 1931

Observation data: J2000.0 epoch
- Right ascension: 5^{h} 31^{m}
- Declination: +34° 15′
- Distance: ~7500 ly
- Apparent magnitude (V): 10.1
- Apparent dimensions (V): 4′
- Constellation: Auriga

NGC 1931, also known as the Fly Nebula, is a reflection and emission nebula wrapped around a young star cluster in the constellation Auriga. The nebula shares similarities to the Orion Nebula as it is a mixed emission-reflection nebula that also contains a small Trapezium of hot young stars. At around 2 million years of age, most of the ongoing star formation in the star cluster is hidden away in the nebula. It is believed that the main ionizing source for the dusty molecular cloud is a single, hot B-type star. The distance from Earth is estimated at 7500 light years.

== History ==
The German-born English astronomer William Herschel discovered the small reflection nebula in 1793 and noted seeing a few stars in the middle. IC 417 is a nearby nebula discovered in 1892. In 1931, Swedish astronomer Per Collinder included it in his catalog of open star clusters as the "nebulous cluster" Collinder 68. American astronomer Stewart Sharpless cataloged the emission component, which lies outside the center, as Sh 2-237 in 1959.
