= Sh 2-37 =

Emission nebula

Sharpless 2-37
Emission nebula
- H II region
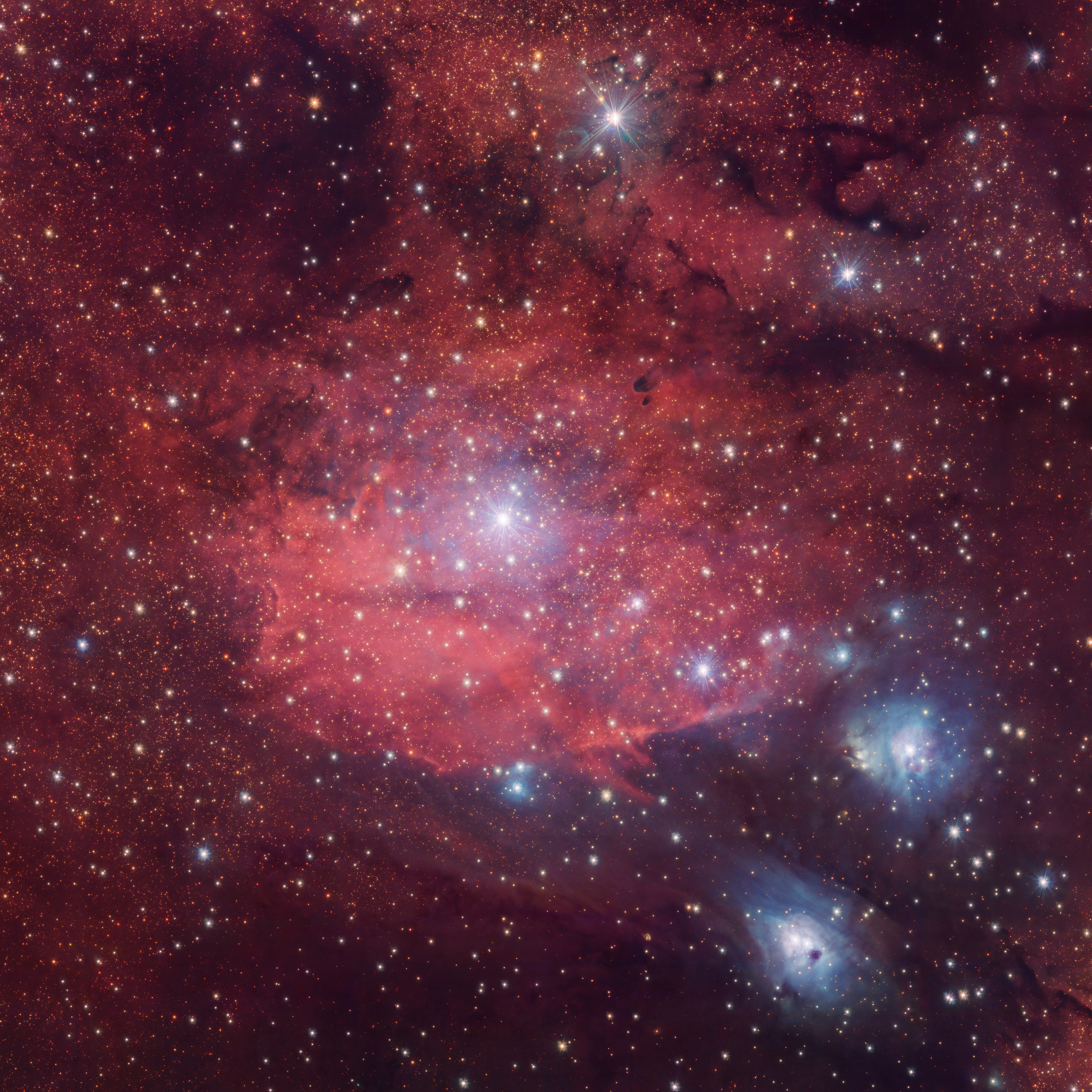
- As viewed in 2023

Observation data: epoch
- Right ascension: 18^{h} 18^{m} 48^{s}
- Declination: −19° 45′ 03″
- Distance: 5800 ly
- Apparent magnitude (V): 7.7
- Apparent dimensions (V): 19.2' × 14.2'
- Constellation: Sagittarius

Physical characteristics
- Radius: 34 ly
- Designations: Gum 78, IC 1283/4, RCW 153, LBN 47

Sh 2-37, also known by the designation IC 1284, or the common name Twiddlebug Nebula, is an emission nebula in the constellation Sagittarius. It is located is the direction of ionizing star cluster Dias 5. It also contains the radio source W 34.

It is located near the center of the galaxy, and is partially obscured by dust. Nearby Sh 2-37, which appears mostly red, are two small blue reflection nebulae, known as NGC 6589 and NGC 6590. SIMBAD notably provides the wrong coordinates for Sh 2-37, giving it the same coordinates as nearby NGC 6590.

== Discovery ==
Sh 2-37 was discovered by Edward Emerson Barnard on a photographic plate on 31 May 1892. He initially described it as a "nebulous star".
