= HD 65750 =

Star in the constellation Carina

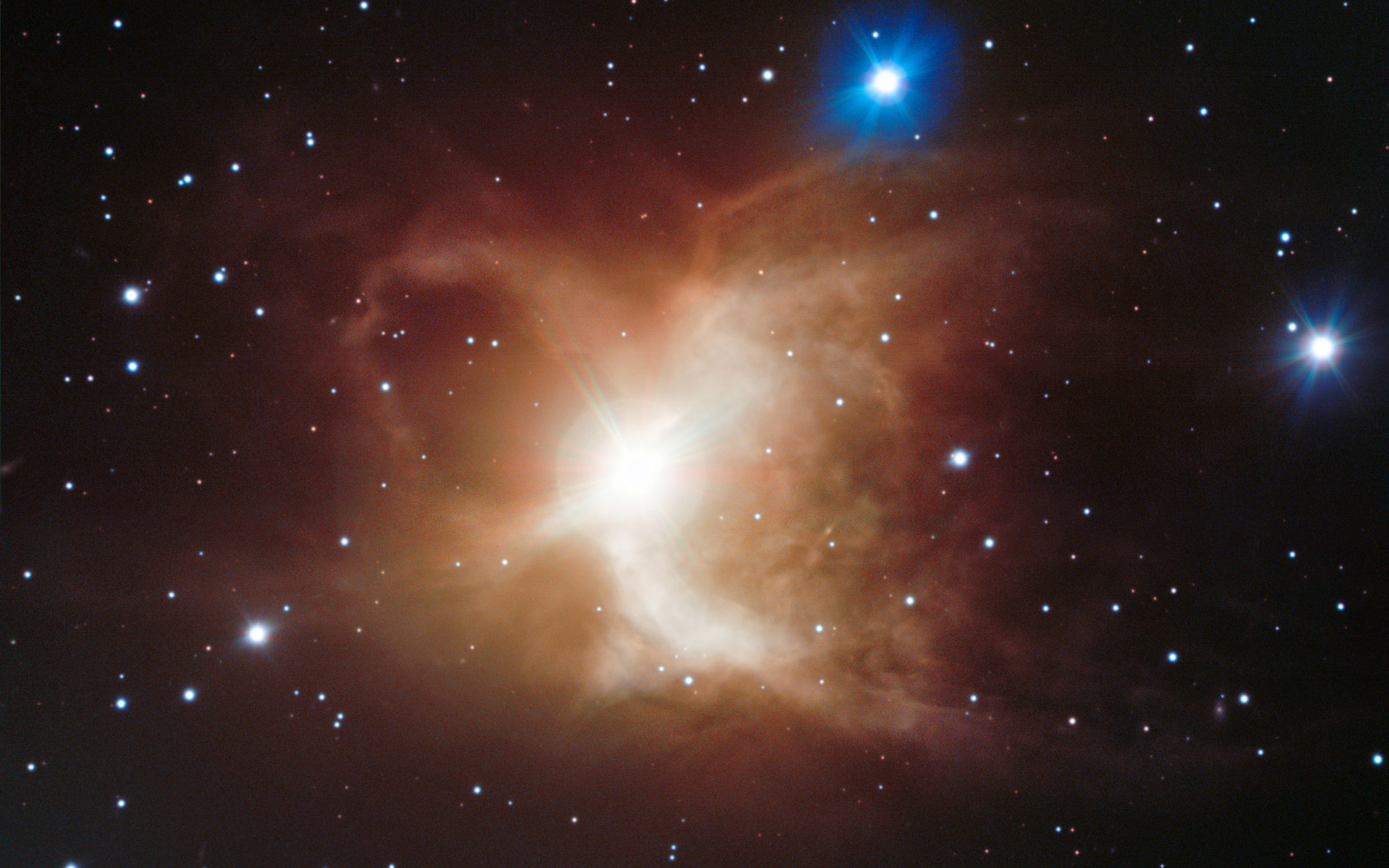
- The nebula surrounding HD 65750

Observation data Epoch J2000 Equinox ICRS
- Constellation: Carina
- Right ascension: 07^{h} 56^{m} 50.94795^{s}
- Declination: −59° 07′ 32.7605″
- Apparent magnitude (V): 6.2 - 7.1

Characteristics
- Evolutionary stage: AGB
- Spectral type: M1 II
- U−B color index: +2.18
- B−V color index: +1.93
- Variable type: LB

Astrometry
Radial velocity (R_{v})	+23.17 km/s
Proper motion (μ)	RA: −4.030 mas/yr Dec.: +9.789 mas/yr
Parallax (π)	2.6230±0.0931 mas
Distance	1,240 ± 40 ly (380 ± 10 pc)

Details
Mass	3.6 M_{☉}
Radius	121 R_{☉}
Luminosity	2,297 L_{☉}
Surface gravity (log g)	0.60 cgs
Temperature	3,640 K
Metallicity [Fe/H]	−0.4 dex

Other designations
- V341 Car, CD−58°1926, HD 65750, HIP 38834, SAO 235638, HR 3126

Database references
SIMBAD	data

HD 65750, also known as V341 Carinae, is a bright red giant star in the constellation Carina. It is surrounded by a prominent reflection nebula, known as IC 2220, nicknamed the Toby Jug Nebula.

== Characteristics ==
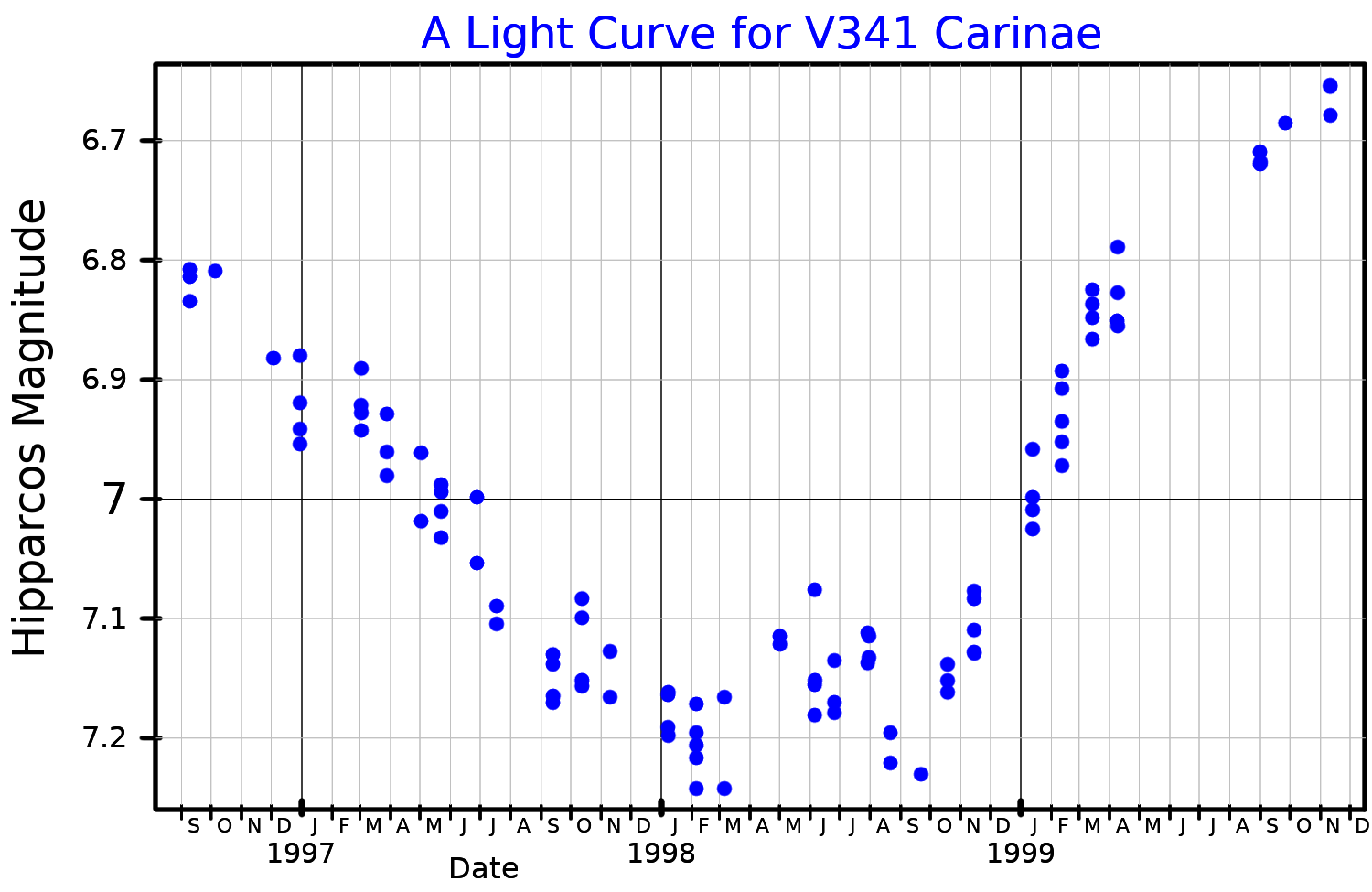
A light curve for V341 Carinae, plotted from Hipparcos data.

Olin Jeuck Eggen and Norman Roy Stokes announced their discovery that the star's brightness varies, in 1970. It was given its variable star designation, V341 Carinae, in 1975. HD 65750 is located about 900 light years away, and has an apparent magnitude that varies between 6.2 and 7.1 and a metallicity just 40% of the Sun. When it is at its brightest, it is very faintly visible to the naked eye of a person with excellent observing conditions. It is part of the Diamond Cluster moving group.

The star has a radial velocity of 20 km/s. The star has a radius over 100 times wider than the Sun's; were it to replace the Sun, HD 65750 would extend past the orbit of Mercury.

== Nebula ==
The nebula is unusual as the variations in its brightness appear to be unrelated to the host star. One theory is that rather than being an accreting protoplanetary disk the star may be an evolved star that is losing material.
