= NGC 6589 =

Reflection nebula in the constellation Sagittarius

Reflection nebula
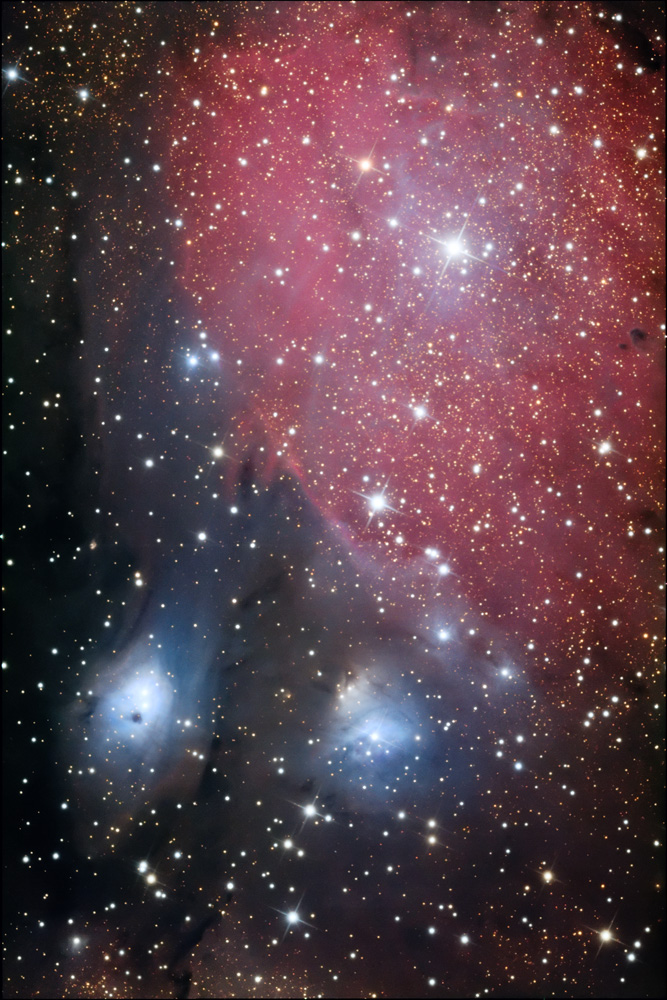
- NGC 6589 is the rightmost blue nebula in this image. Also in this image is NGC 6590 (left) and IC 1284 (above)

Observation data: J2000.0 epoch
- Right ascension: 18^{h} 16^{m} 55.4^{s}
- Declination: −19° 46′ 38″
- Apparent dimensions (V): 5.0' × 3.0'
- Constellation: Sagittarius
- Designations: IC 4690, IRAS 18138-1954, DG 149, LBN 011.53-01.63, Ced 157a

NGC 6589 is a reflection nebula located in the constellation of Sagittarius, and it was discovered by Truman Safford on August 28, 1867. In August 1905, Edward Barnard listed it as IC 4690.
