= NGC 267 =

Open cluster in the constellation Tucana

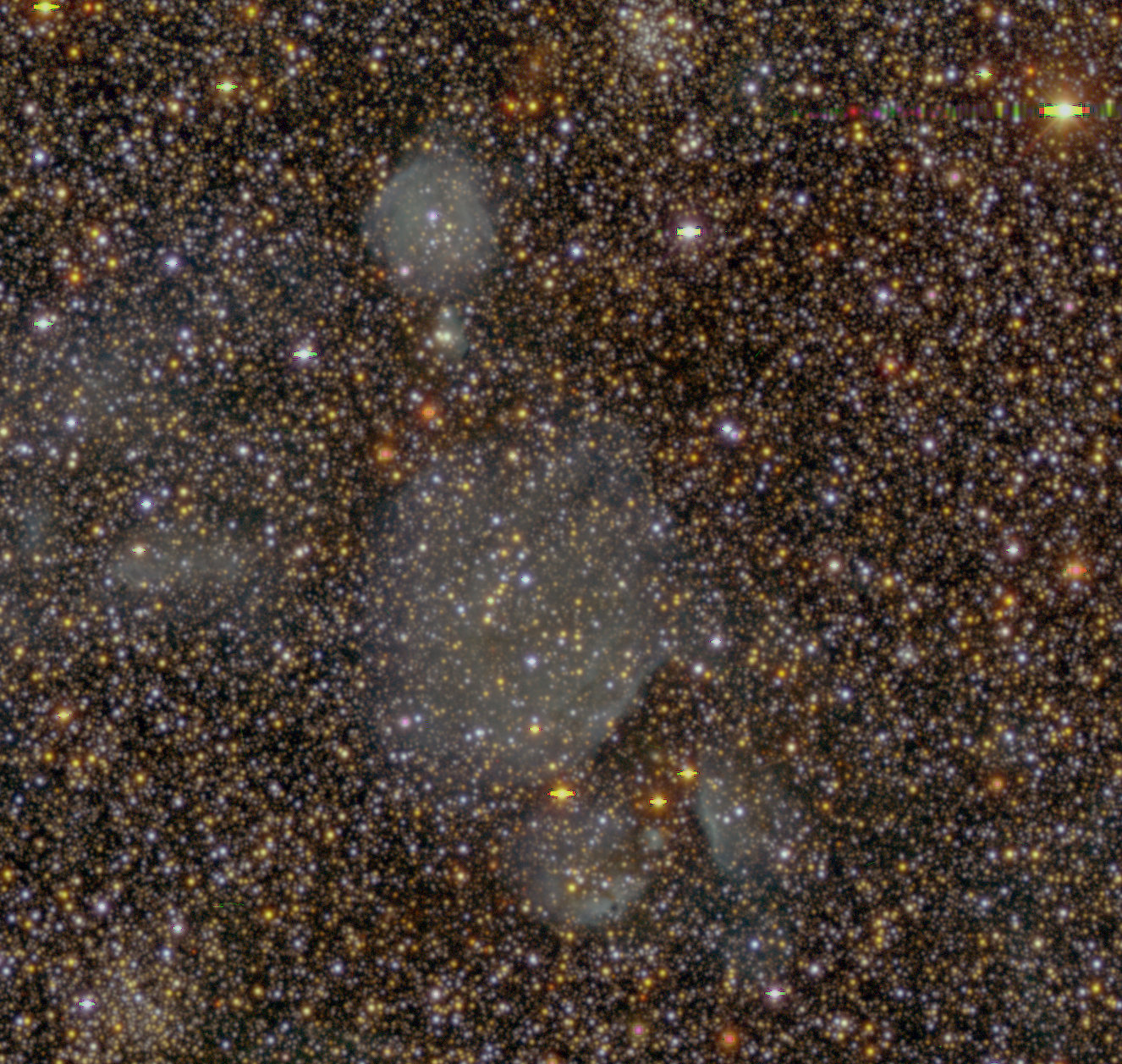
- NGC 267 as seen by DECam

Observation data (J2000 epoch)
- Right ascension: 00^{h} 48^{m} 02.9^{s}
- Declination: −73° 16′ 27″
- Distance: ~200000
- Apparent dimensions (V): 2.4' x 1.7'

Physical characteristics
- Other designations: ESO 029-SC 015.

Associations
- Constellation: Tucana

NGC 267 is an open cluster in the Small Magellanic Cloud. It is located in the constellation Tucana. It was discovered on October 4, 1836, by John Herschel.
