= Bernes 149 =

Reflection Nebula

Nebula
- Reflection Nebula
- Image of Bernes 149

Observation data: epoch
- Right ascension: 16^{h} 08^{m} 34.00^{s}
- Declination: −39° 05′ 36.0″
- Constellation: Lupus; Scorpius
- Designations: Bernes 149, GN 16.05.2

Bernes 149 (also known as GN 16.05.2) is a reflection nebula located in the Lupus 3 dark molecular cloud, a star-forming region situated on the border between the constellations of Lupus and Scorpius. It is part of a larger complex of dark clouds known for active low-mass star formation. The nebula scatters light from nearby young stars, giving it a distinctive blue appearance due to the preferential scattering of shorter wavelengths by interstellar dust. The nebula is illuminated by two bright stars V856 Scorpii (A9V) and V1027 Scorpii (A0/3III). Notable object within the region is Herbig-Haro (HH) object, HH 78.
