= Vera Gaze =

Soviet astronomer

- Вера Фёдоровна Газе
- Born: Vera Fedorovna Gaze; 29 December 1899; Saint Petersburg, Russia
- Died: 3 October 1954 (aged 54); Leningrad, Soviet Union
- Occupation: Astronomer
- Years active: 1921–1954
- Known for: Nebulae studies

Vera Fedorovna Gaze (Russian: Вера Фёдоровна Газе; 29 December 1899 – 3 October 1954) was a Russian astronomer who studied emission nebula and minor planets. She discovered around 150 new nebulae and was posthumously honored by the minor planet 2388 Gaze and the Gaze Crater on Venus, both of which are named after her.

== Early life and education ==
Gaze was born on 29 December (17 December O.S.) 1899 (N.S.) in Saint Petersburg, Russia. Between 1921 and 1926, she worked at the Astronomical Institute of Leningrad (forerunner to the Institute of Theoretical Astronomy) and studied at the Petrograd University. She graduated in 1924, and in 1926 went to work at the Pulkovo Observatory.

== Career ==
She participated in the 1929 gravimetric survey expedition and the 1936 expedition to observe the total solar eclipse. The 1936 eclipse crossed the Soviet territory and could only be viewed within the USSR. Nearly 30 international expeditions traveled to Russia on June 19 for the observations which were visible for two hours. Between 1936 and 1940, Gaze was a victim of "political repression", which stemmed from an incident bringing unfavorable publicity to the Pulkovo Observatory. In 1935, she had discovered that a report she had been given to translate into English, made by Nikolai Mikhailovich, Voronov contained errors in its calculations. Voronov was a rising star and had published a paper on the theories of the motion of small planets. He was offered a position at the Pulkovo Observatory on the basis of that paper and produced another, calculating the ephemeris of 13 Egeria. It was in this paper that Gaze found the error and reported it to her superior. When questioned, Voronov admitted that he had not used his theory in making the calculations, but had estimated the locations of the planet. The scandal caused him to be fired, but was picked up by the press and all who were involved were arrested. Gaze was suspected of helping him since she had translated several of his papers. She was eventually released when signed testimony against her could not be obtained.

In 1940, Gaze moved to the Simeiz Observatory, which was part of the Abastumani Astrophysical Observatory of Georgia between 1941 and 1945 and then became part of the Crimean Astrophysical Observatory of the Soviet Academy of Sciences. She discovered, in 1940, changes in the spectrum of γ Cassiopeiae. Working with Grigory Abramovich Shajn, director of the observatory, Gaze investigated the molecular content of carbon isotopes in stars and studied the structure of nebulae, attempting to determine their size and the role of dust and gas in formation of the nebulae. She discovered around 150 "new galactic emission nebulae by recording their light in the red H-alpha (Hα) emission". In 1952 Gaze and Shajn published a book together entitled, Some results of the study of diffuse gaseous nebulae and their attitude to cosmogony.

== Death and legacy ==
Gaze died on 3 October 1954 in Leningrad and was buried at the memorial cemetery for astronomers, near the Pulkovo Observatory outside Saint Petersburg.

Posthumously, a minor planet, 2388 Gaze, discovered in 1977 was named after her, as was the Gaze Crater on Venus.

== Selected works ==
- Gaze, V F (1926). Orbit of the spectroscopic binary [alpha] Ursae Minoris (1922-1924). Moscow, Russia: Glav. upr. nauch. uchrezhdeniiami.
- Gaze, V F (1929). Velocity curves of [zeta] Geminorum in layers of different height in the chromosphere. Moscow, Russia: Glav. upr. nauch. uchrezhdeniiami.
- Appell, Paul Émile; Gaze, Vera Fedorovna; Malkin, Nikolaj Romanovič; Hublarova, S L; Idel'son, Naum Il'ič (1936). Figury ravnovesiâ vraŝaûŝejsâ odnorodnoj židkosti (in Russian). Leningrad, Russia: ONTI. Glavnaâ redakciâ obŝestvennoj literatury.
- Shain, Grigorii Abramovich; Gaze, Vera Fedorovna (1952). Nekotorye rezul'taty issledovanii a diffuznykh gazovykh tumannosteii ikh otnoshenie k kosmogonii (in Russian). Moscow, Russia: Izd-vo Akademii nauk SSSR.

== Bibliography ==
- Bergeron, Jacqueline (2012). Reports on Astronomy. Springer Science & Business Media. ISBN 978-94-011-1100-3.
- Guillermier, Pierre; Koutchmy, Serge (16 July 1999). Total Eclipses: Science, Observations, Myths and Legends. Chichester, UK: Springer Science & Business Media. p. 105. ISBN 978-1-85233-160-3.
- Lankford, John (1 January 1997). History of Astronomy: An Encyclopedia. New York, New York: Taylor & Francis. ISBN 978-0-8153-0322-0.
- Perelman, Yakov; Shkarovsky-Raffe, Arthur (2000). Astronomy for Entertainment. Honolulu, Hawaii: University Press of the Pacific. ISBN 9780898750560.
- Schmadel, Lutz D. (9 March 2013). Dictionary of Minor Planet Names. Berlin, Germany: Springer Science & Business Media. ISBN 978-3-662-02804-9.
- Trimble, Virginia; Williams, Thomas R.; Bracher, Katherine; Jarrell, Richard; Marché, Jordan D.; Ragep, F. Jamil (2007). Biographical Encyclopedia of Astronomers. New York, New York: Springer Science & Business Media. ISBN 978-0-387-30400-7.
