= NGC 6914 =

Reflection nebula in the constellation Cygnus

Reflection nebula
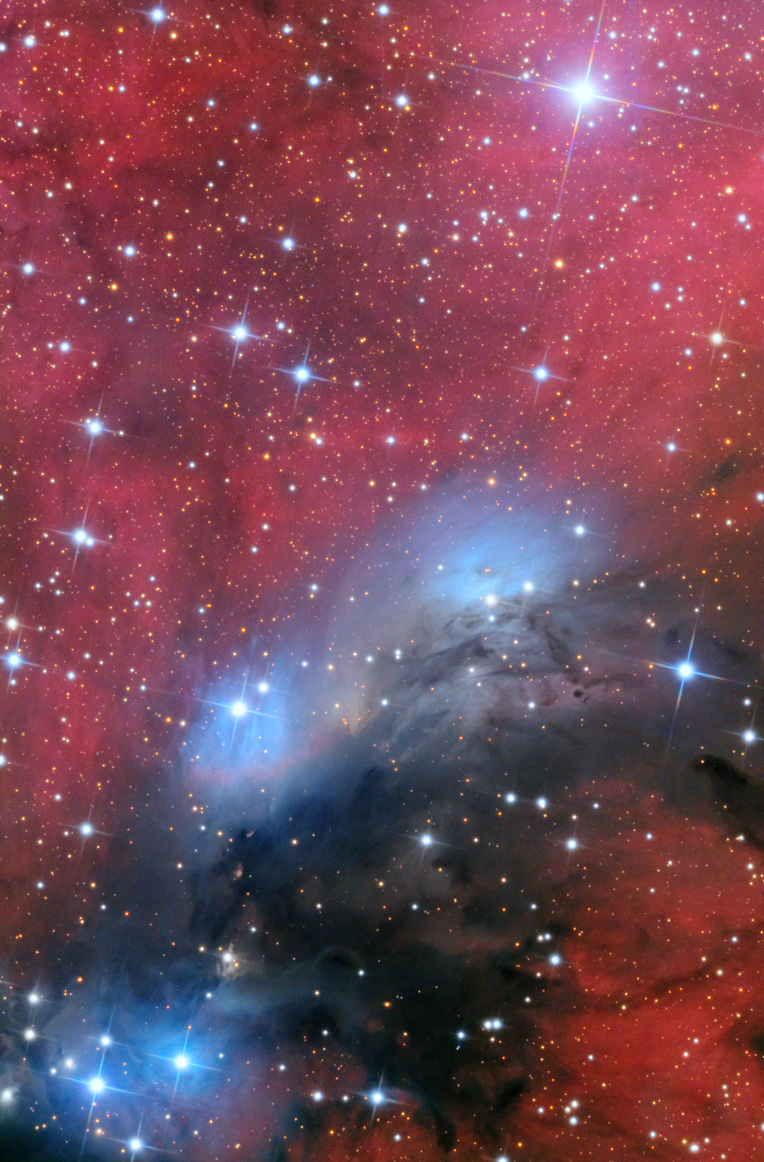
- NGC 6914

Observation data: J2000.0 epoch
- Right ascension: 20^{h} 24^{m} 43.3^{s}
- Declination: 42° 28′ 58″
- Distance: 6,000 ly
- Apparent dimensions (V): 3.0' × 3.0'
- Constellation: Cygnus
- Designations: LBN 274, LBN 280

NGC 6914 is a reflection nebula located approximately 6,000 light-years away in the constellation of Cygnus, and was discovered by Édouard Stephan on August 29, 1881. Ultraviolet radiation from stars in the Cygnus OB2 association ionize the nebula's hydrogen.
