= NGC 1985 =

Reflection nebula in the constellation Auriga

Reflection nebula
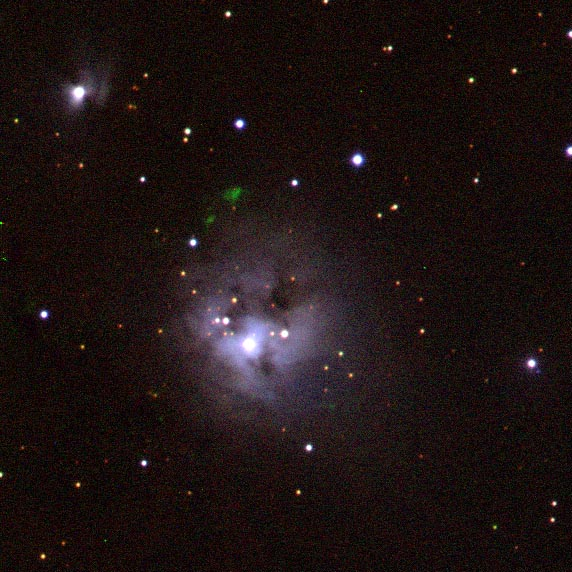
- Reflection nebula NGC 1985 (Isaac Newton Telescope)

Observation data: J2000.0 epoch
- Right ascension: 05^{h} 37^{m} 47.8^{s}
- Declination: +31° 59′ 20″
- Apparent magnitude (V): 12.8
- Constellation: Auriga

Physical characteristics
- Dimensions: 0.68′
- Designations: 2MASS J05374779+3159200, PK 176 + 0.1, CS = 13.6, GC 1188, h 359, H 3.865.

NGC 1985 (also known as 2MASS J05374779+3159200) is a reflection nebula located in the constellation Auriga. It was discovered by William Herschel on December 13, 1790. It has an apparent magnitude of 12.8 and is about 40 arcseconds in diameter.
