= NGC 7044 =

Open cluster in the constellation Cygnus

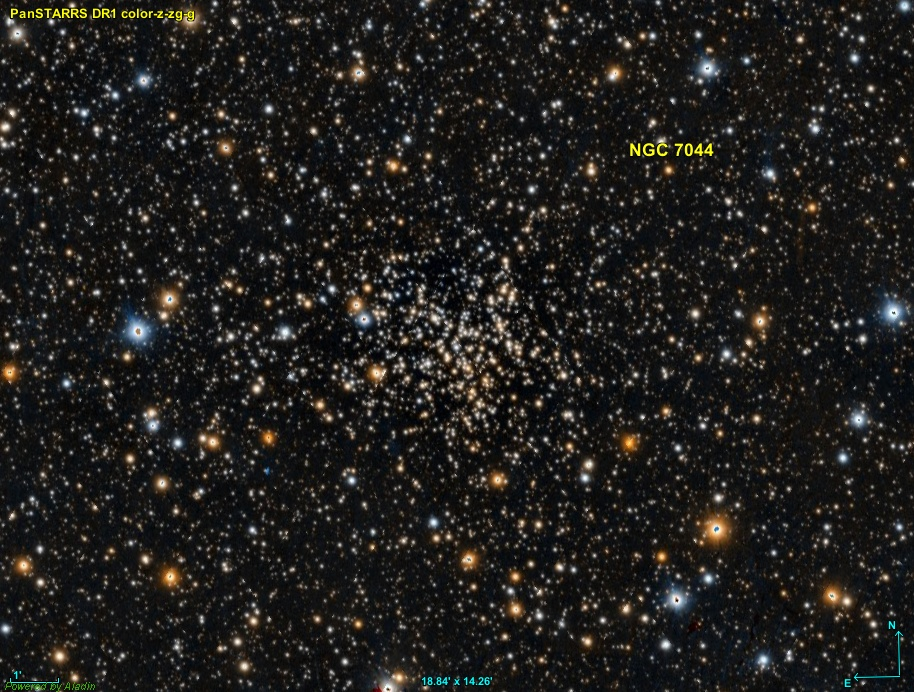
- The open cluster NGC 7044

Observation data (J2000 epoch)
- Right ascension: 21^{h} 13^{m} 09.6^{s}
- Declination: +42° 29′ 39″
- Distance: 10,676.729 (3,273.5)

Physical characteristics

Associations
- Constellation: Cygnus

NGC 7044 is an open cluster located in the constellation Cygnus. Containing approximately 742 stars, it was discovered by 18th century English astronomer William Herschel on 17 October 1786. It is located approximately 10,676 light years, (3273.5 pc), from the Earth. Given its visual magnitude of 12, NGC 7044 is visible with the help of a telescope having an aperture of 8 inches (200mm) or more. NGC 7024 is moving towards the Sun with a radial velocity of −48.444 km/s.
