= IC 2220 =

Emission nebula in the constellation Carina

Reflection nebula
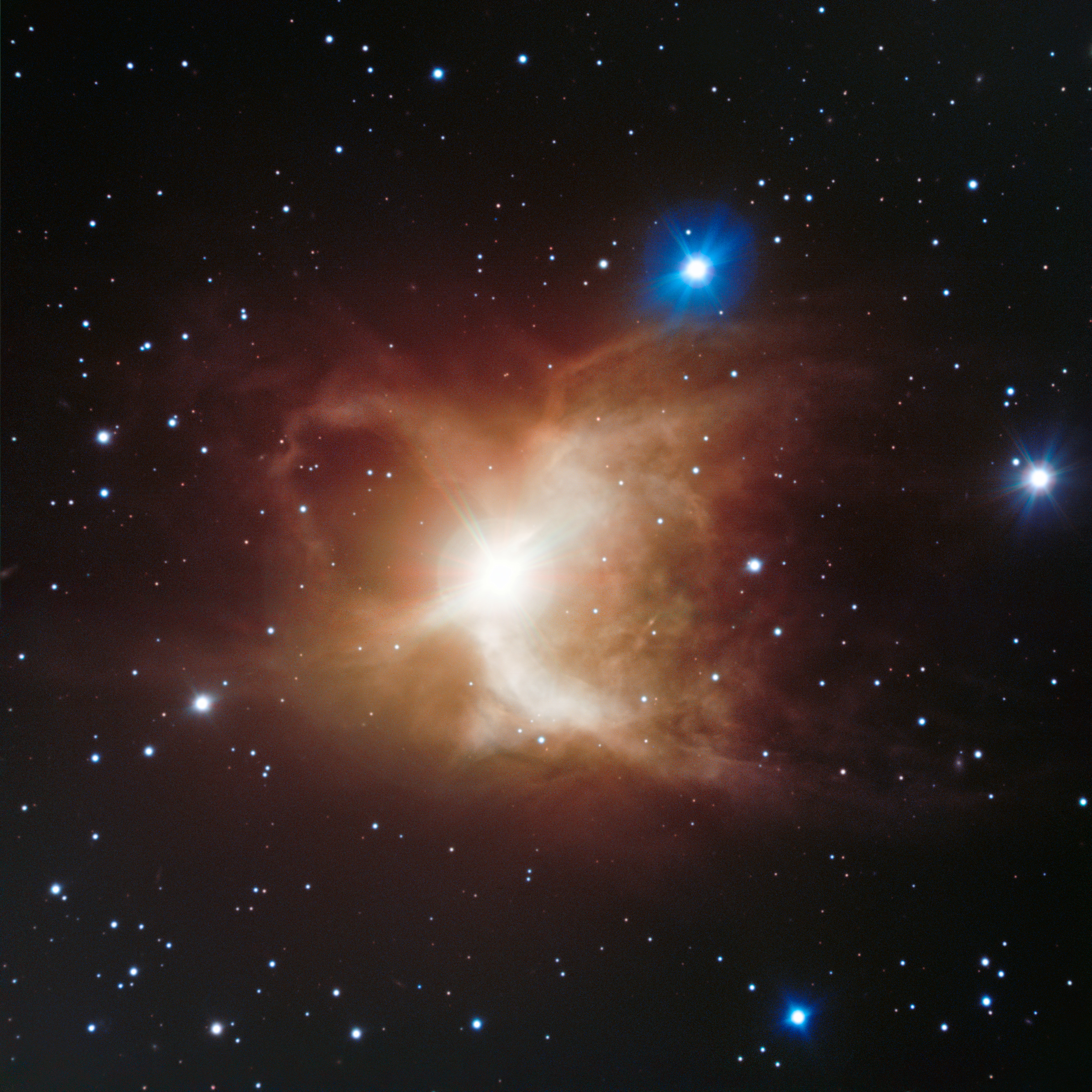
- IC 2220 as seen with ESO's Very Large Telescope

Observation data: J2000 epoch
- Right ascension: 07^{h} 56^{m} 51.3^{s}
- Declination: −59° 07′ 31″
- Distance: 1,200 ly
- Apparent dimensions (V): 8 × 8 °
- Constellation: Carina
- Designations: IC 2220, AM 0755-585, ESO 124-3

IC 2220, also commonly known as the Toby Jug Nebula, is a reflection nebula located around 1200 light years away from Earth in the southern constellation of Carina. The nebula was formed from mass being ejected from its central red giant star during its final phases of life. The nebula was observed in 2023 by the Gemini South telescope situated in Chile.

== Characteristics ==
It is a reddish-orange nebula that has a peculiar butterfly-shaped having an almost symmetrical bipolar and biconical structure. The nebula has an estimated mass of 0.01-0.7 solar masses. The filements of the nebula resemble the structure of a magnetic dipole field. These filaments are centered around the central red giant star. The dust in this nebula is similar to average interstellar dust.

A very large, closed loop is visible and has been tentatively interpreted as a giant prominence originating from the central star. Two different bubble-like nebulous structures centered around the central star has been observed. They appeared to have formed during, at least, two separate mass ejection events.

The Milky Way has provided a significant amount of external illumination to IC 2220. There has been no evidence found for the presence of extended red emission in the nebula.

=== Central star ===
The central star is a bright early M3V-type red giant star known as HR 3126 (HD 65750 or V341 Car). It is a long variable star with a magnitude of around 6.5 and a mass of 5 solar masses. The nebula surrounding it is made up of cool gas and dust which reflect the stars light. This is rarely seen because the end-of-life phase of these types of stars is relatively brief. Astronomers believe that it is formed following the interaction between the dying red giant and a former companion star that was torn apart.

However UB V photometry of the star and the surrounding nebula were taken and the nebula seems to be bluer. The high ultraviolet excess could indicate that the star still has a fainter blue companion that is exciting the nebula. It could however mean that the grain properties in reflection nebulae around M-stars and B-stars are different than those of other stars.
