= NGC 261 =

Diffuse nebula in the constellation Tucana

Diffuse nebula
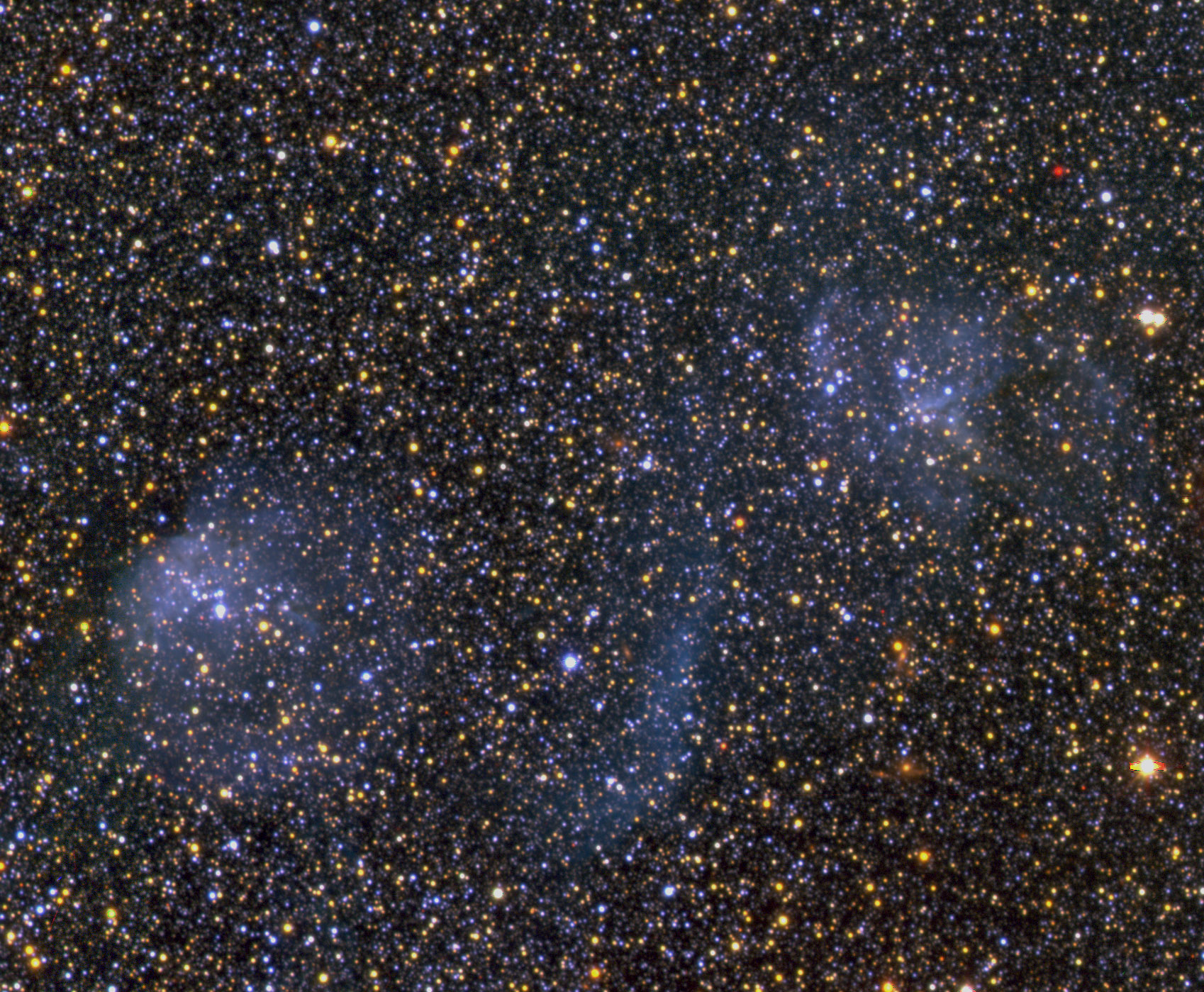
- NGC 261

Observation data: J2000 epoch
- Right ascension: 00^{h} 46^{m} 27.9^{s}
- Declination: −73° 06′ 13″
- Apparent dimensions (V): 1.3' × 1.1'
- Constellation: Tucana
- Designations: ESO 029-EN 012, IRAS 00447-7322

NGC 261 is a diffuse nebula located in the constellation Tucana. It was discovered on September 5, 1826, by James Dunlop.

== See also ==
- List of NGC objects (1–1000)
