= N41 (nebula) =

Nebula in the constellation Dorado

Emission nebula
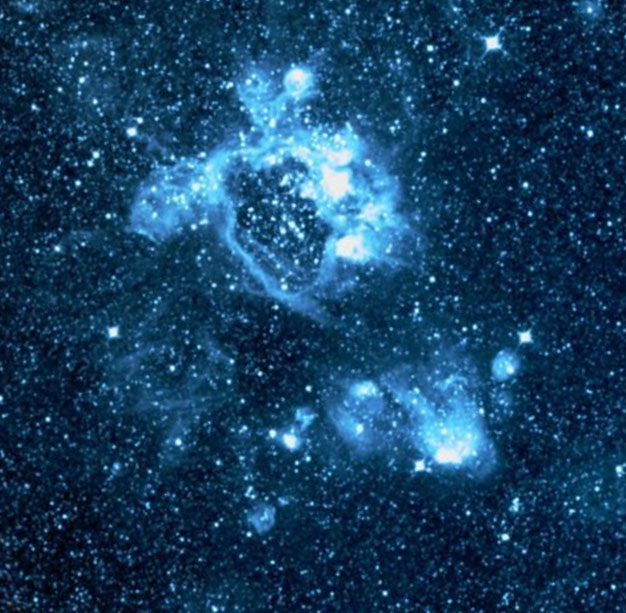
- N41, located at the northeast of N44

Observation data: J2000.0 epoch
- Right ascension: 05^{h} 20^{m} 31^{s}
- Declination: −68° 01′ 01″
- Distance: ~160,000-170,000 ly
- Constellation: Dorado

Physical characteristics
- Radius: ~50 ly

N41 (also known as LMC N41, LHA 120-N 41) is an emission nebula in the north part of the Large Magellanic Cloud in the constellation Dorado. Originally catalogued in Karl Henize's "Catalogue of H-alpha emission stars and nebulae in the Magellanic Clouds" of 1956, it is approximately 100 light-years wide and 160,000-170,000 light-years distant.
