= LHA 120-N 55 =

Nebula in the constellation Dorado

Nebula
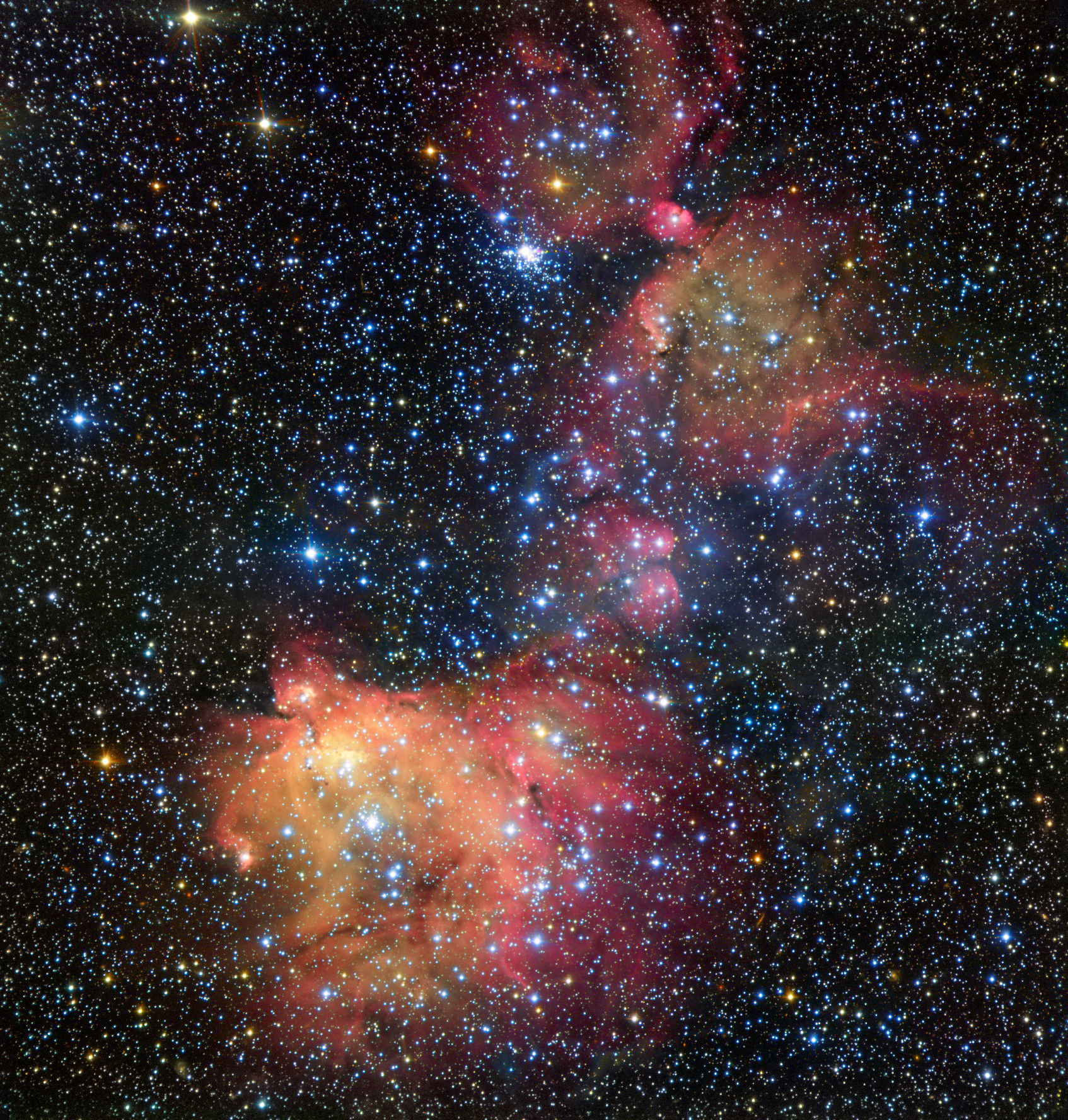
- VLT image of LHA 120-N 55

Observation data: J2000 epoch
- Right ascension: 05^{h} 32^{m} 32.9^{s}
- Declination: −66° 24′ 20″
- Distance: 160000 ly (50000 pc)
- Apparent dimensions (V): 7.0′ × 5.0′
- Constellation: Dorado
- Designations: DEM L 228

LHA 120-N 55 or N55 is an emission nebula located within the Large Magellanic Cloud (LMC). N55 is situated inside a superbubble called LMC 4. It is a glowing clump of gas and dust that gets its light output from the hydrogen atoms shedding electrons within it. It was named in 1956, in a catalogue of H-alpha emission line objects in the LMC.

Multiple dense molecular clumps have been detected, at least fifteen of which contain young stellar objects.
