= Emission nebula =

Nebula formed of ionized gases that emit light of various wavelengths

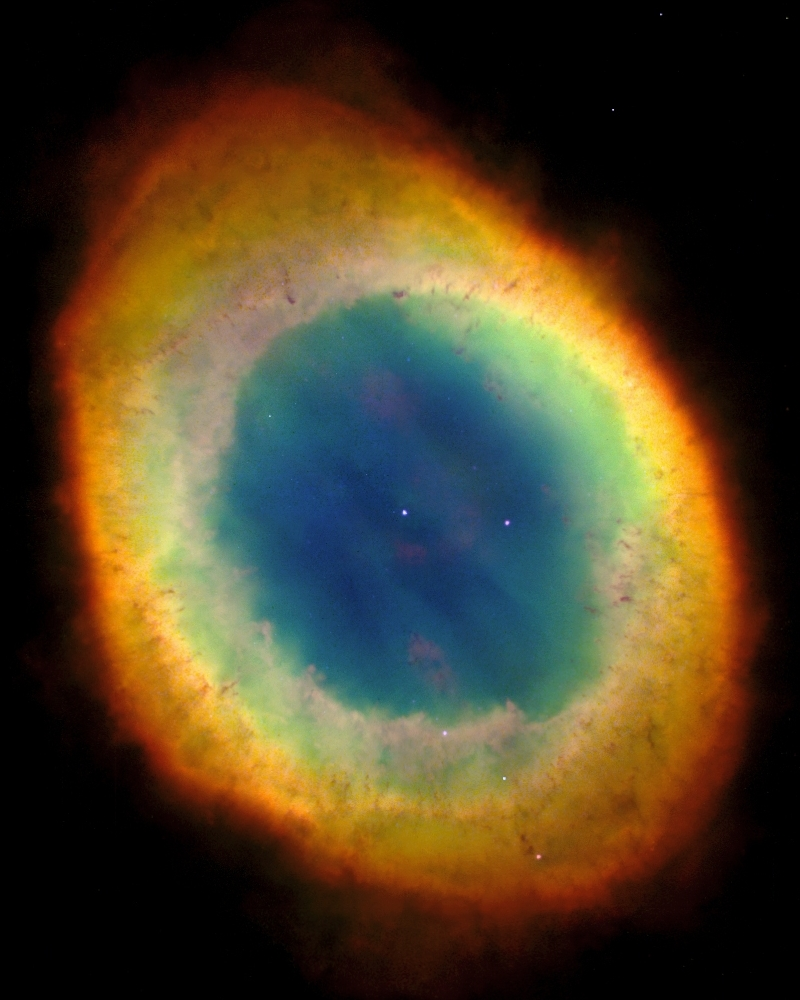
Planetary nebulae, represented here by the Ring Nebula, are examples of emission nebulae.

An emission nebula is a nebula formed of ionized gases that emit light of various wavelengths. The most common source of ionization is high-energy ultraviolet photons emitted from a nearby hot star. Among the several different types of emission nebulae are H II regions, in which star formation is taking place and young, massive stars are the source of the ionizing photons; and planetary nebulae, in which a dying star has thrown off its outer layers, with the exposed hot core then ionizing them.

== General information ==
Usually, a young star will ionize part of the same cloud from which it was born, although only massive, hot stars can release sufficient energy to ionize a significant part of a cloud. In many emission nebulae, an entire cluster of young stars is contributing energy.

Stars that are hotter than 25,000 K generally emit enough ionizing ultraviolet radiation (wavelength shorter than 91.2 nm) to cause the emission nebulae around them to be brighter than the reflection nebulae. The radiation emitted by cooler stars is generally not energetic enough to ionize hydrogen, which results in the reflection nebulae around these stars giving off less light than the emission nebulae.

The four visible hydrogen emission spectrum lines in the Balmer series. H-alpha is the red line at the right.

The nebula's color depends on its chemical composition and degree of ionization. Due to the prevalence of hydrogen in interstellar gas, and its relatively low energy of ionization, many emission nebulae appear red due to strong emissions of the Balmer series. If more energy is available, other elements will be ionized, and green and blue nebulae become possible. By examining the spectra of nebulae, astronomers infer their chemical content. Most emission nebulae are about 90% hydrogen, with the remaining helium, oxygen, nitrogen, and other elements.

Some of the most prominent emission nebulae visible from the northern celestial hemisphere are the North America Nebula (NGC 7000) and Veil Nebula NGC 6960/6992 in Cygnus, while in the south celestial hemisphere, the Lagoon Nebula M8 / NGC 6523 in Sagittarius and the Orion Nebula M42. Further in the southern hemisphere is the bright Carina Nebula NGC 3372.

Emission nebulae often have dark areas in them which result from clouds of dust which block the light.

Many nebulae are made up of both reflection and emission components such as the Trifid Nebula.

== Image gallery ==
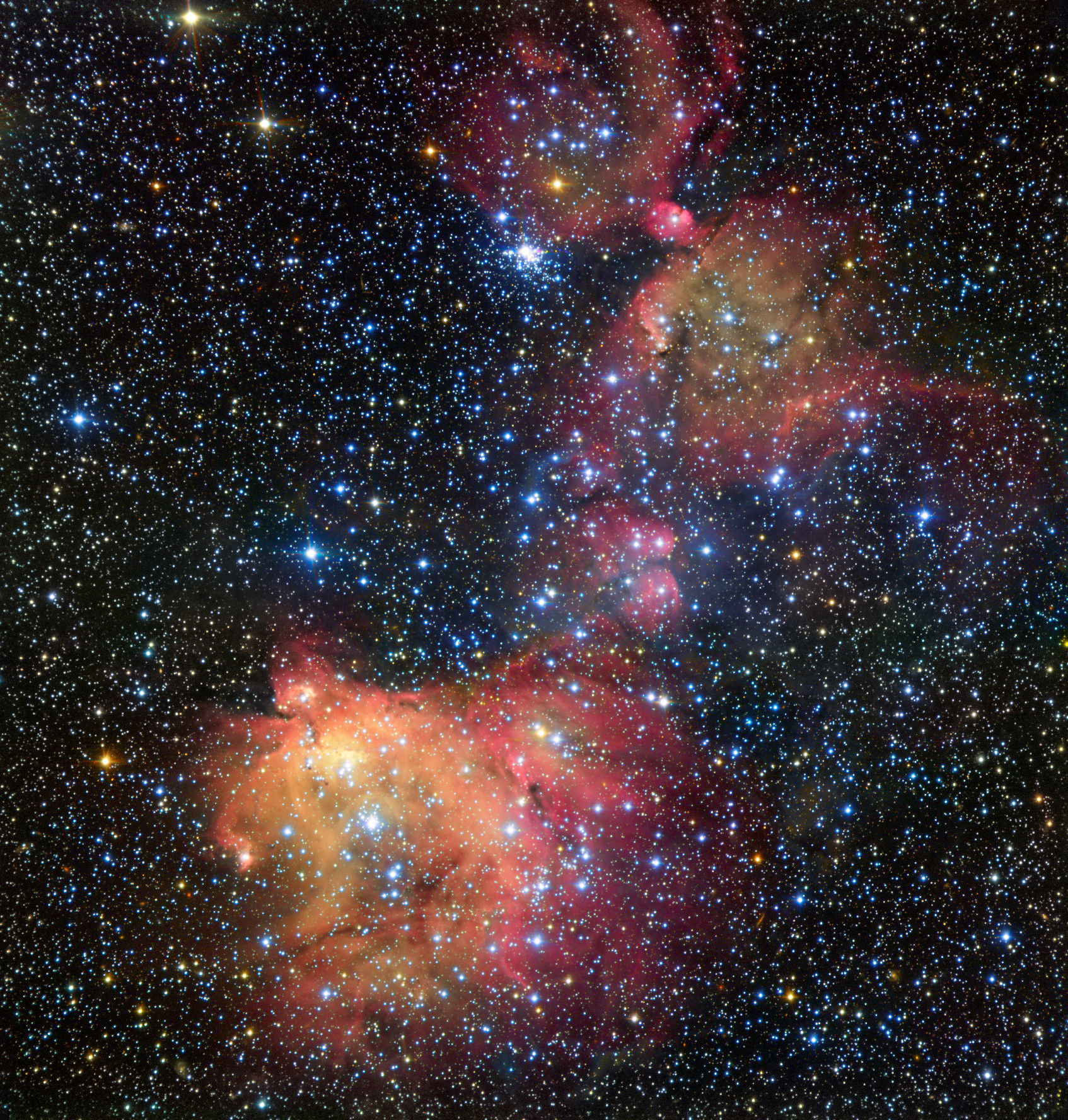
Emission nebula LHA 120-N 55 in the Large Magellanic Cloud.

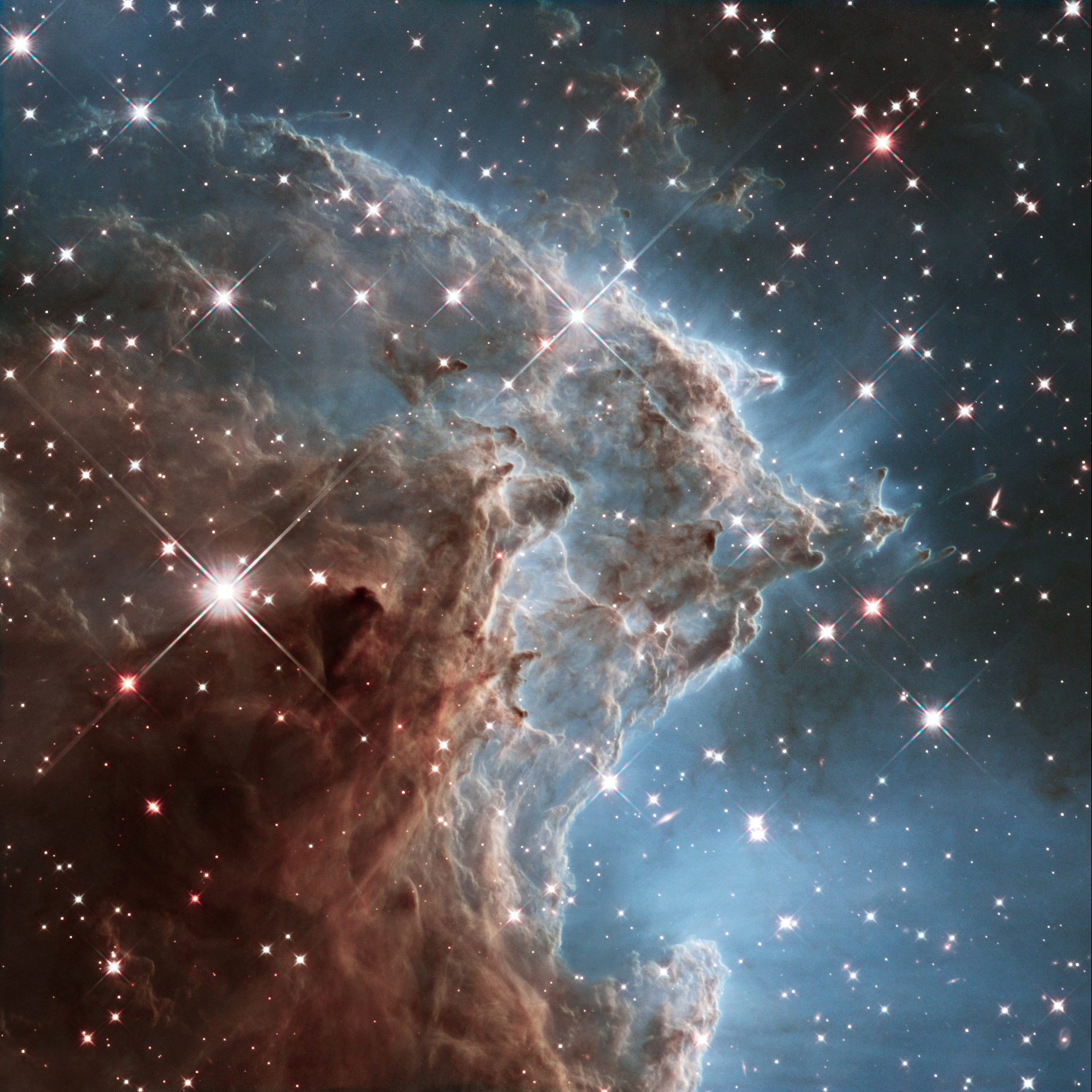
Hubble image of emission nebula NGC 2174.

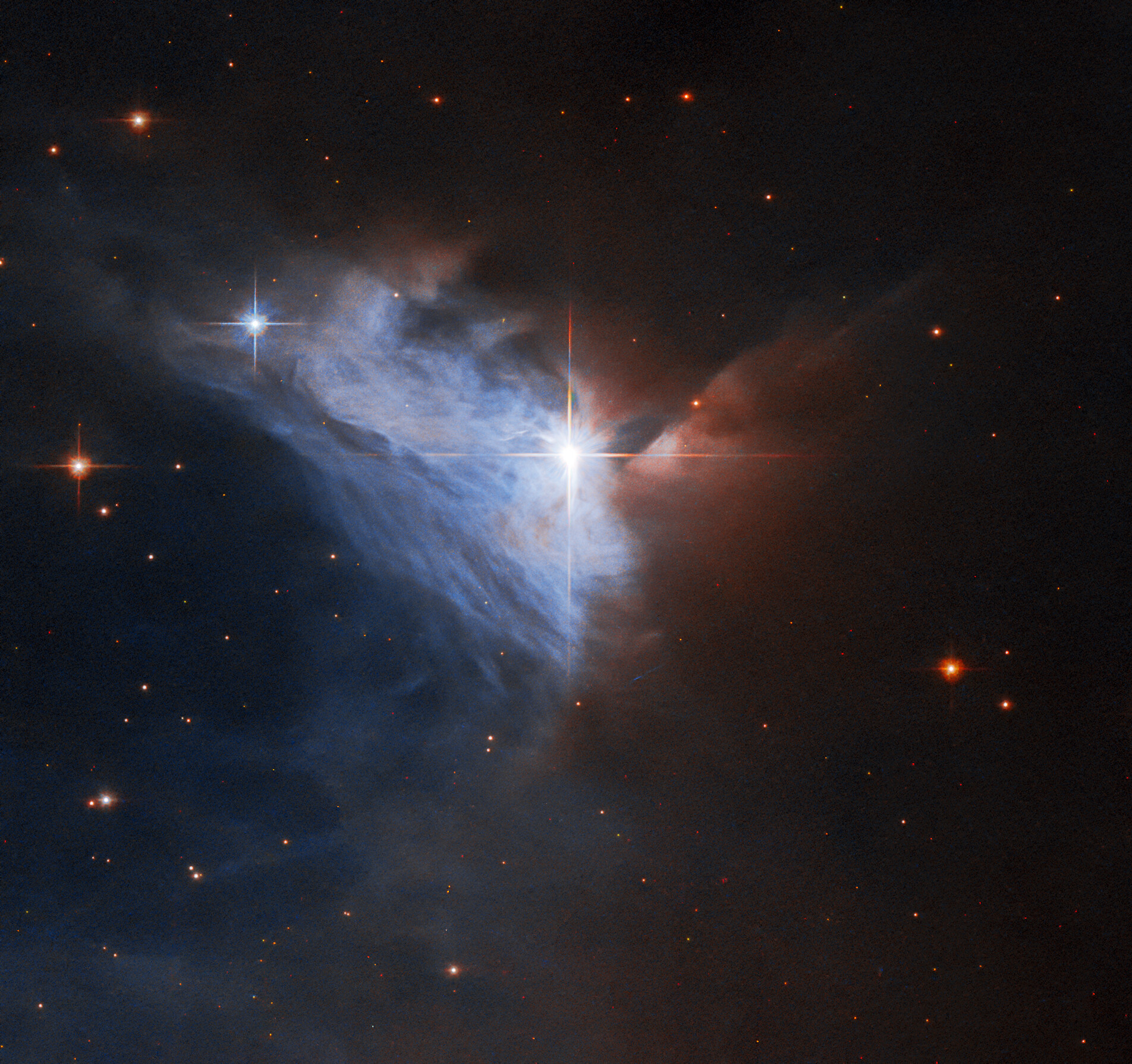
Hubble image of emission nebula NGC 2313.

== See also ==
- Herbig–Haro object
- N41 (nebula)
