= Crescent Nebula =

Emission nebula in the constellation Cygnus

Emission nebula
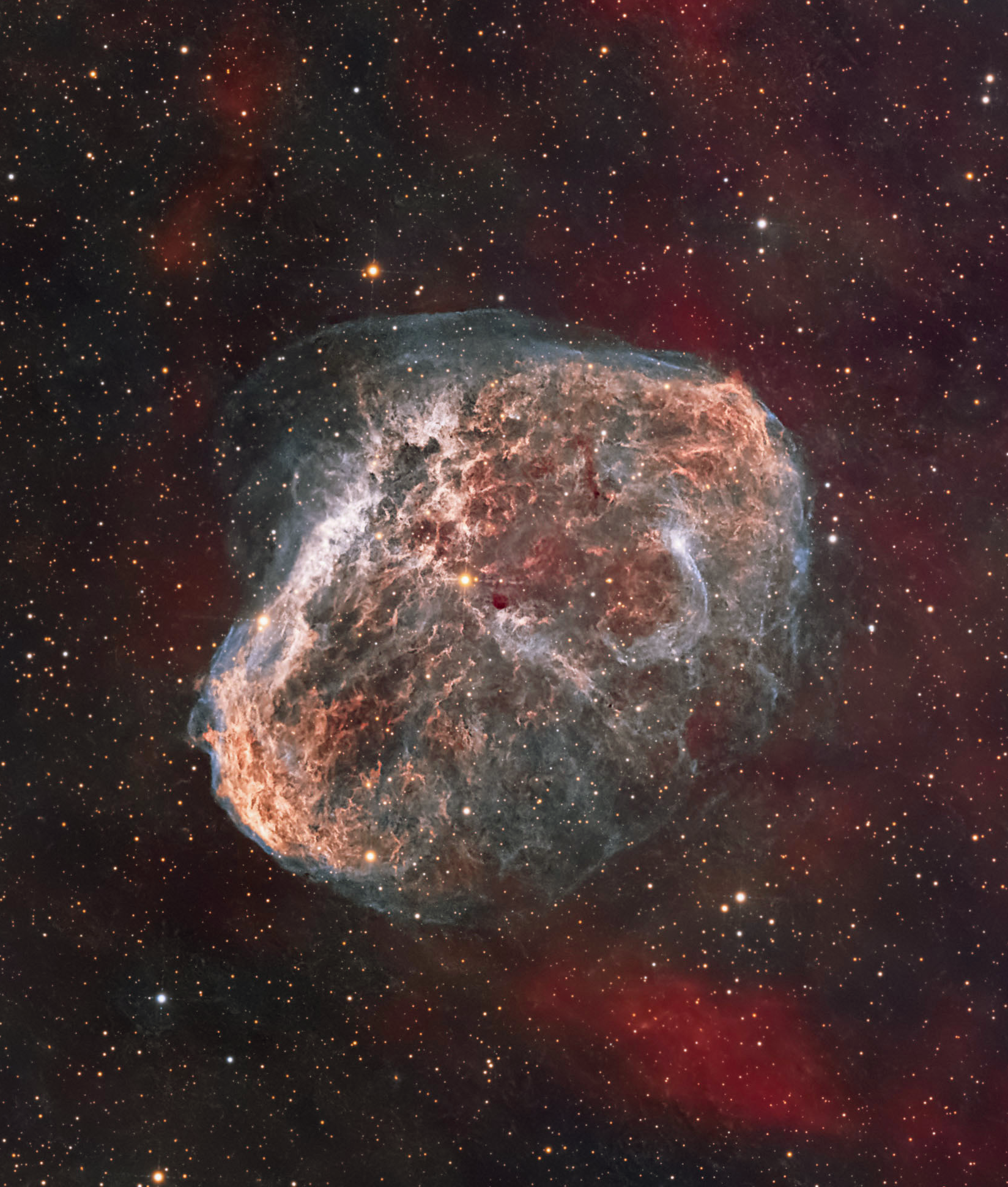
- The Crescent Nebula, captured with a color camera, narrowband filter, and high-speed amateur telescope

Observation data: J2000.0 epoch
- Right ascension: 20^{h} 12^{m} 7^{s}
- Declination: +38° 21.3′
- Distance: 5,000 ly
- Apparent magnitude (V): +7.4
- Apparent dimensions (V): 18′ × 12′
- Constellation: Cygnus
- Designations: NGC 6888, Sharpless 105, Caldwell 27

The Crescent Nebula (also known as NGC 6888, Caldwell 27, Sharpless 105) is an emission nebula in the constellation Cygnus, about 5000 light-years away from Earth. It was discovered by William Herschel in 1792. It is formed by the fast stellar wind from the Wolf-Rayet star WR 136 (HD 192163) colliding with and energizing the slower moving wind ejected by the star when it became a red giant around 250,000 years ago. The result of the collision is a shell and two shock waves, one moving outward and one moving inward. The inward moving shock wave heats the stellar wind to X-ray-emitting temperatures.

== Visibility ==
The Crescent Nebula is a rather small object located about 2 degrees Southwest of Sadr. While considered bright by astronomical imaging standards, visually it is relatively faint. For most telescopes it requires a UHC or OIII filter to see. Under favorable circumstances a telescope as small as 8 cm (with filter) can see its nebulosity. With higher magnification, it has been reported to have a resemblance to a Euro sign shape leading to a nickname the "Euro Sign Nebula."

== Gallery ==
NGC 6888 (the Crescent Nebula), photographed from Tallinn, Estonia, on 19 October 2026.

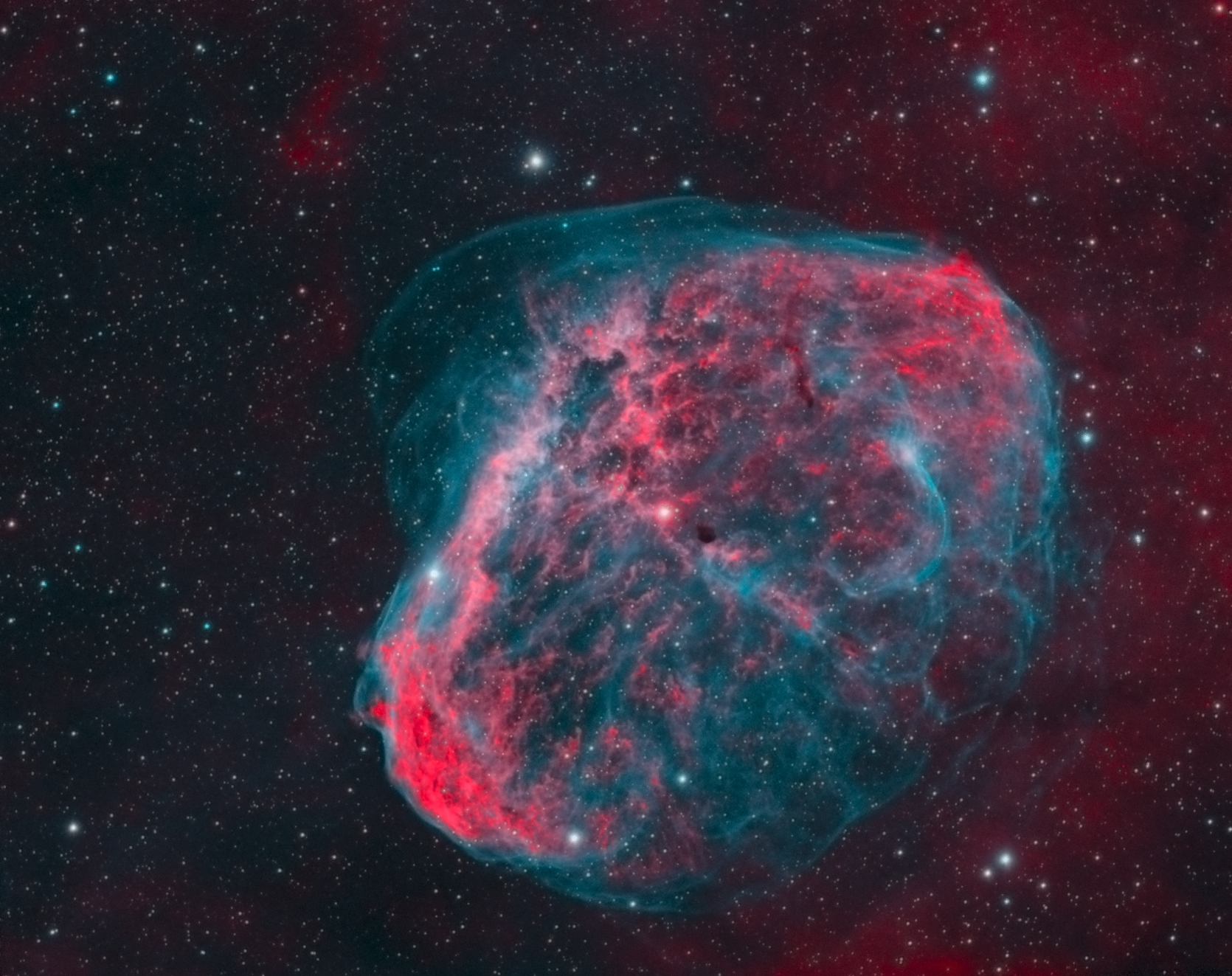
NGC 6888 in Hydrogen and Oxygen Light. HOO Palette. Imaged by Don Christopher Deaver

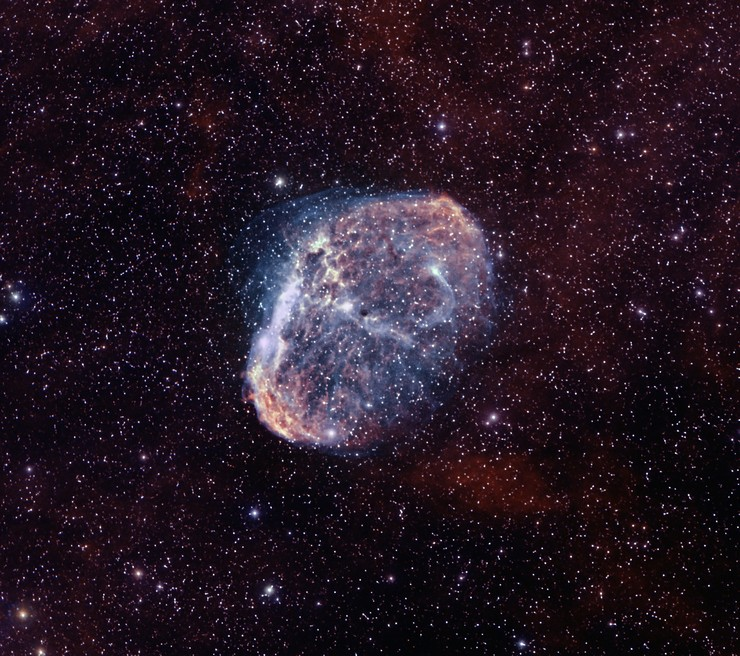
Crescent Nebula in H-alpha and OIII. Imaged with a 715mm focal length telescope. The hydrogen gas is red. The oxygen is blue.

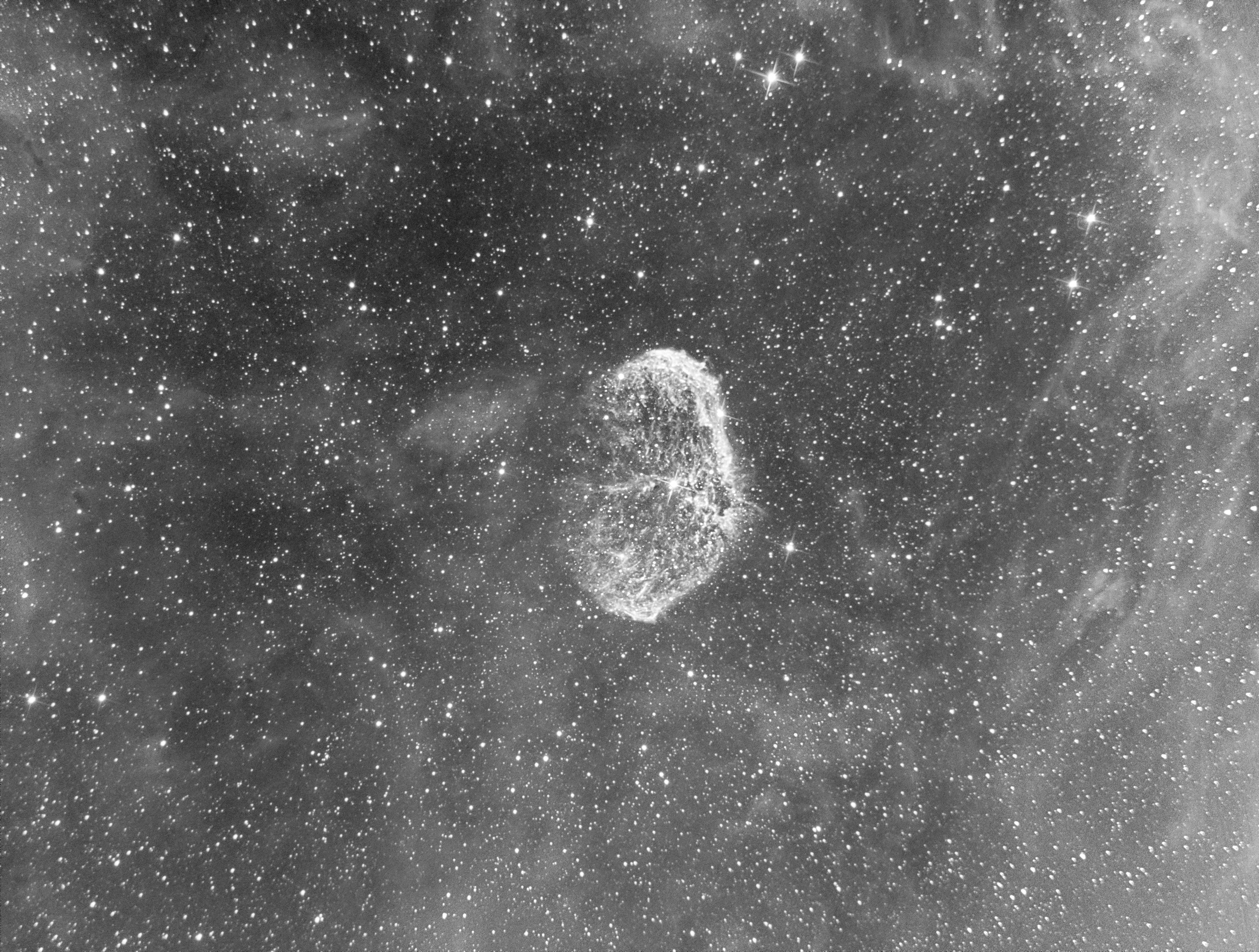
Image of NGC 6888 using H-alpha filter.

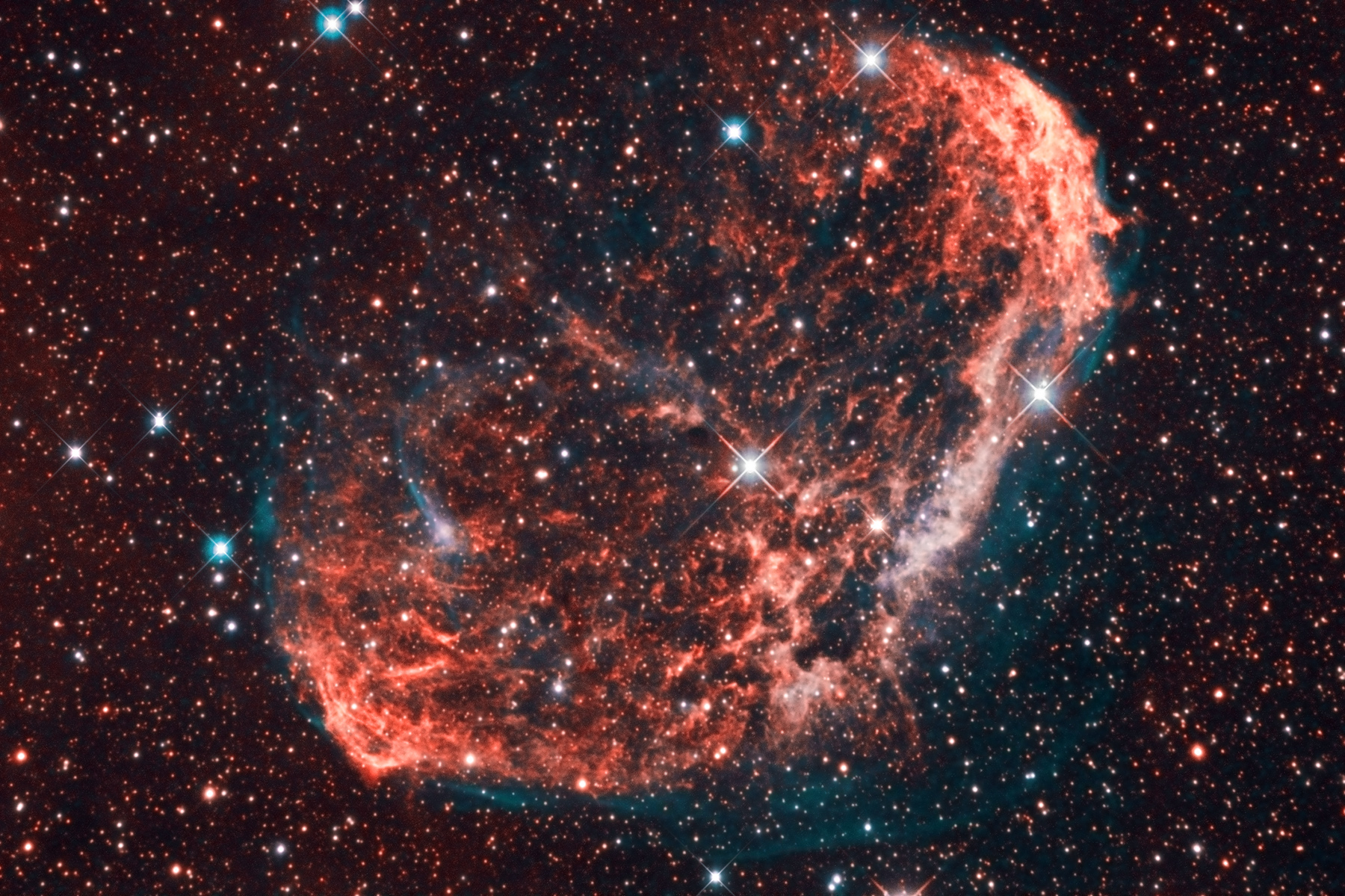
Picture of NGC 6888 captured in narrowband by amateur astronomer Luca Moretti

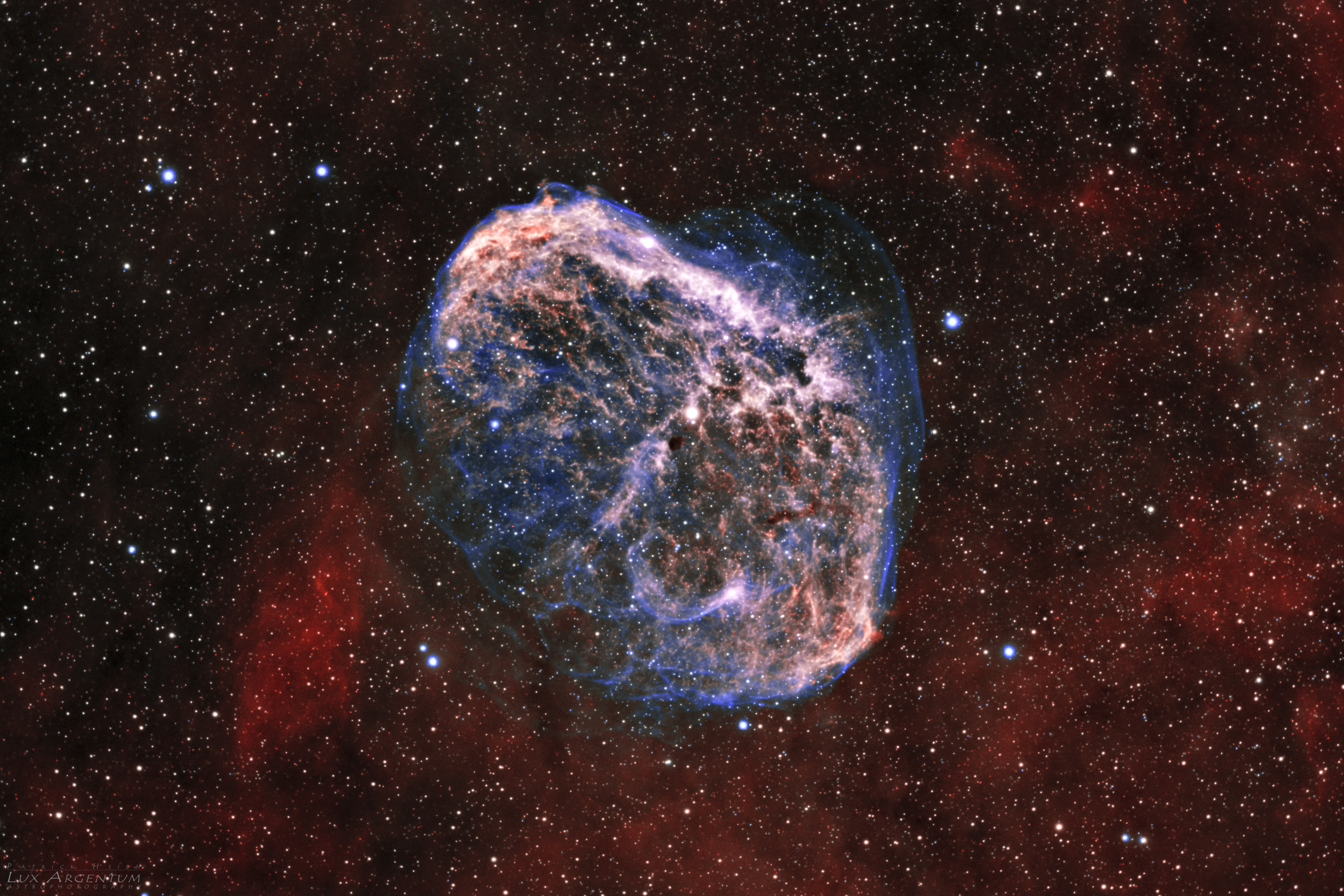
NGC 6888 imaged in 3 nm hydrogen-alpha and oxygen-III narrowband at 2800mm focal length by amateur astronomer Patrick Hsieh.

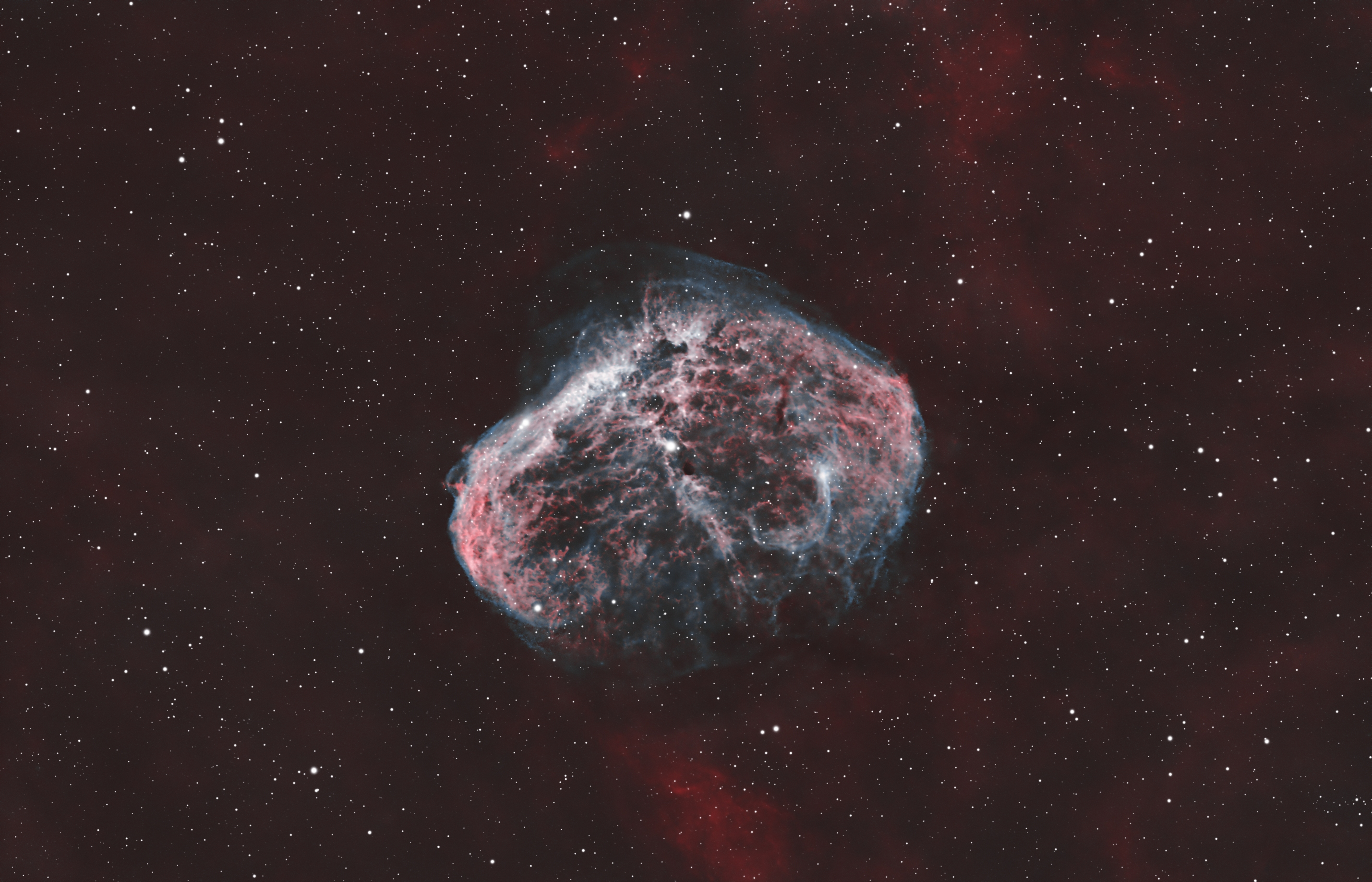
Crescent Nebula (Caldwell27) was captured by David Rousseau from an urban location in Québec, Canada, using Ha and OIII narrowband filters.

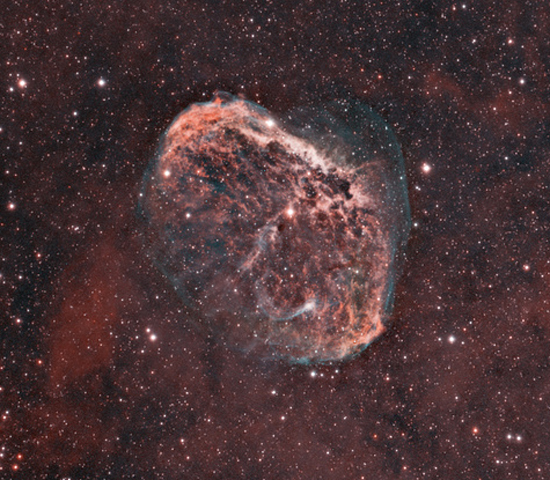
The Crescent Nebula, as taken by an amateur astronomer

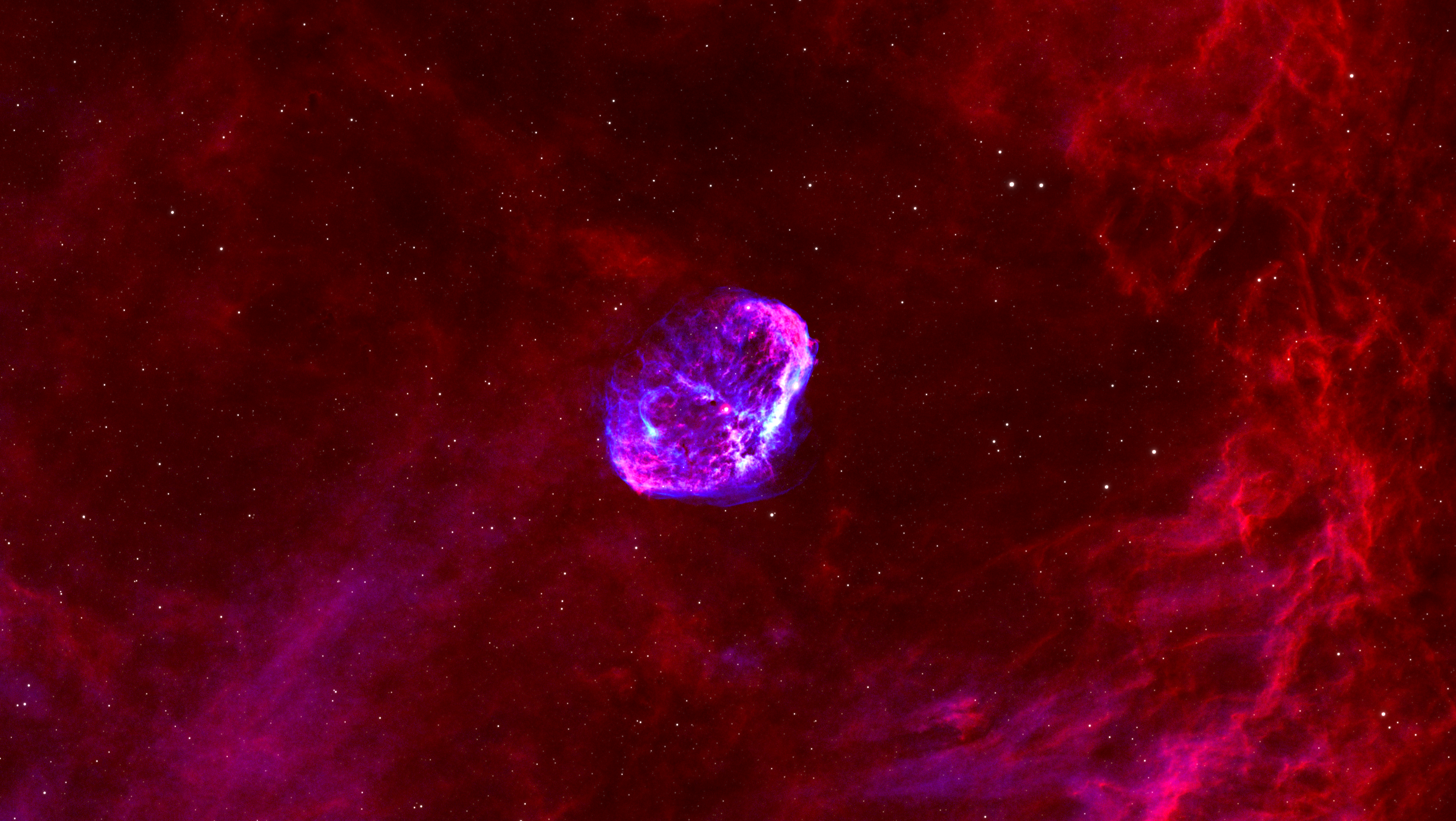
NGC 6888 - The Crescent Nebula, wide field in HOO.

== See also ==
- Cygnus Bubble
