= A Few Seconds Before Happiness =

Black and white photograph from 1956

A Few Seconds Before Happiness is a 1956 black-and-white photograph that depicts a man holding a puppy behind his back with his right hand wearing a white striped shirt, a black Fiddler's cap, loose pants with a belt, and dirty shoes, the man is about to present it to a young boy, who is wearing a plaid t-shirt, and shorts that have a white horizontal streak next to the thigh area. In the photo the man seems to be talking to the young boy. The photograph went viral after it was posted to Twitter by English street artist Banksy on November 28, 2009.
