= Monochrome photography =

Photography in one color

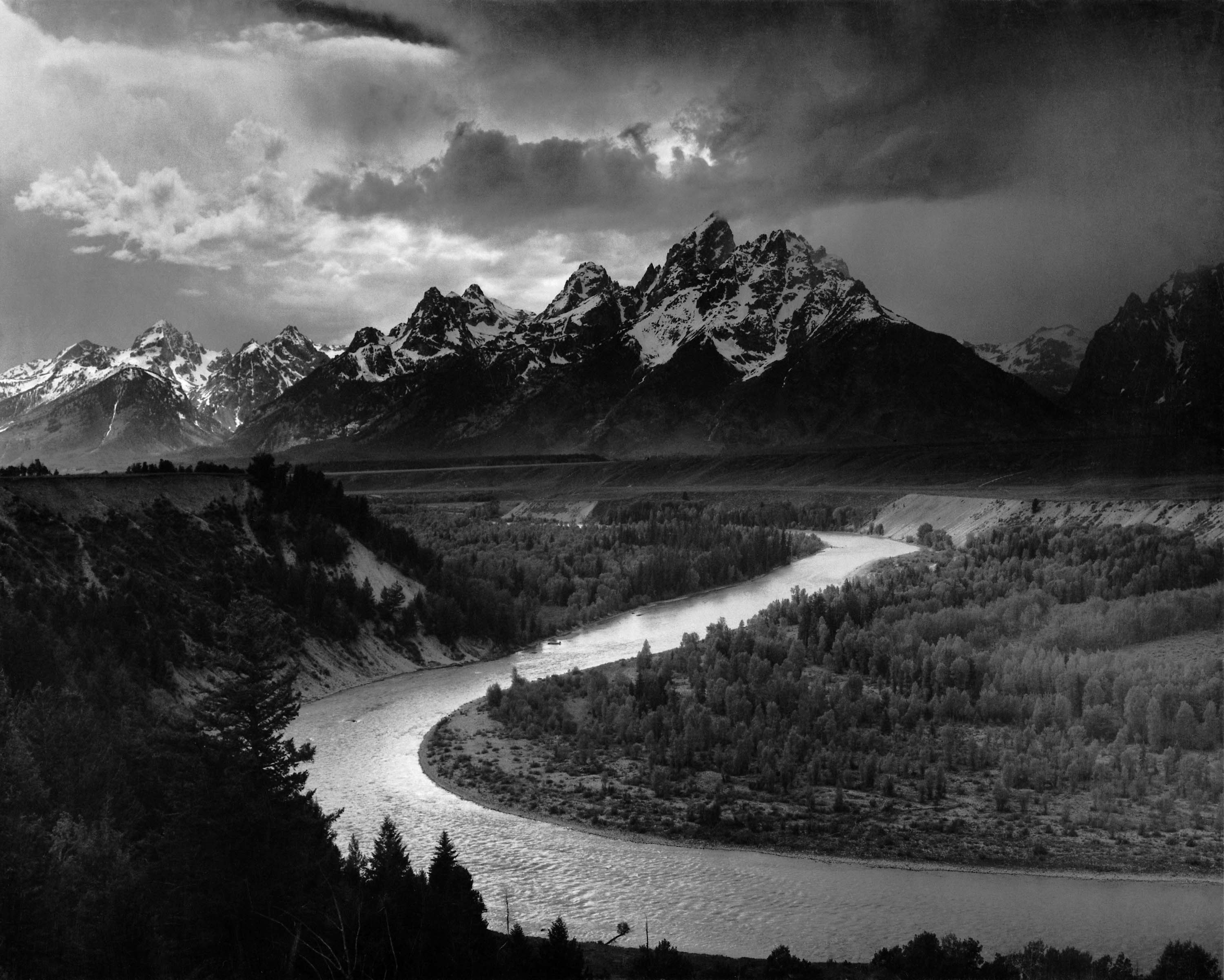
The Tetons and the Snake River, by Ansel Adams

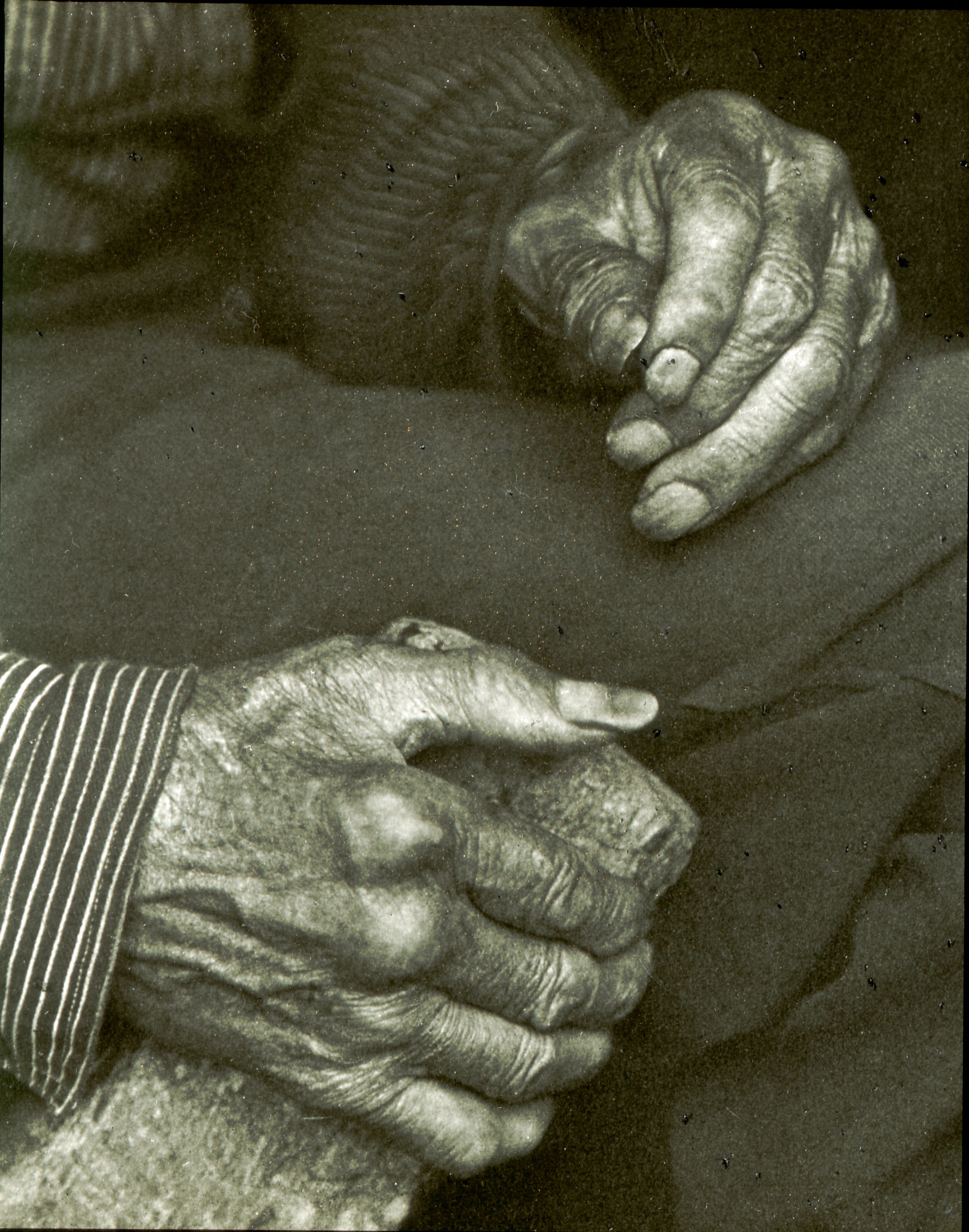
Laborer's hands, by Doris Ulmann

Monochrome photography is photography in which each position on an image can record and show a different amount of light (value), but not a different color (hue). The majority of monochrome photographs produced today are black-and-white, either from a gelatin silver process, or as digital photography. Other hues besides grey can be used to create monochrome photography, but brown and sepia tones are the result of older processes like the albumen print, and cyan tones are the product of cyanotype prints.

As monochrome photography provides an inherently less complete reproduction than color photography, it is mostly used for artistic purposes and certain technical imaging applications.

== Description ==
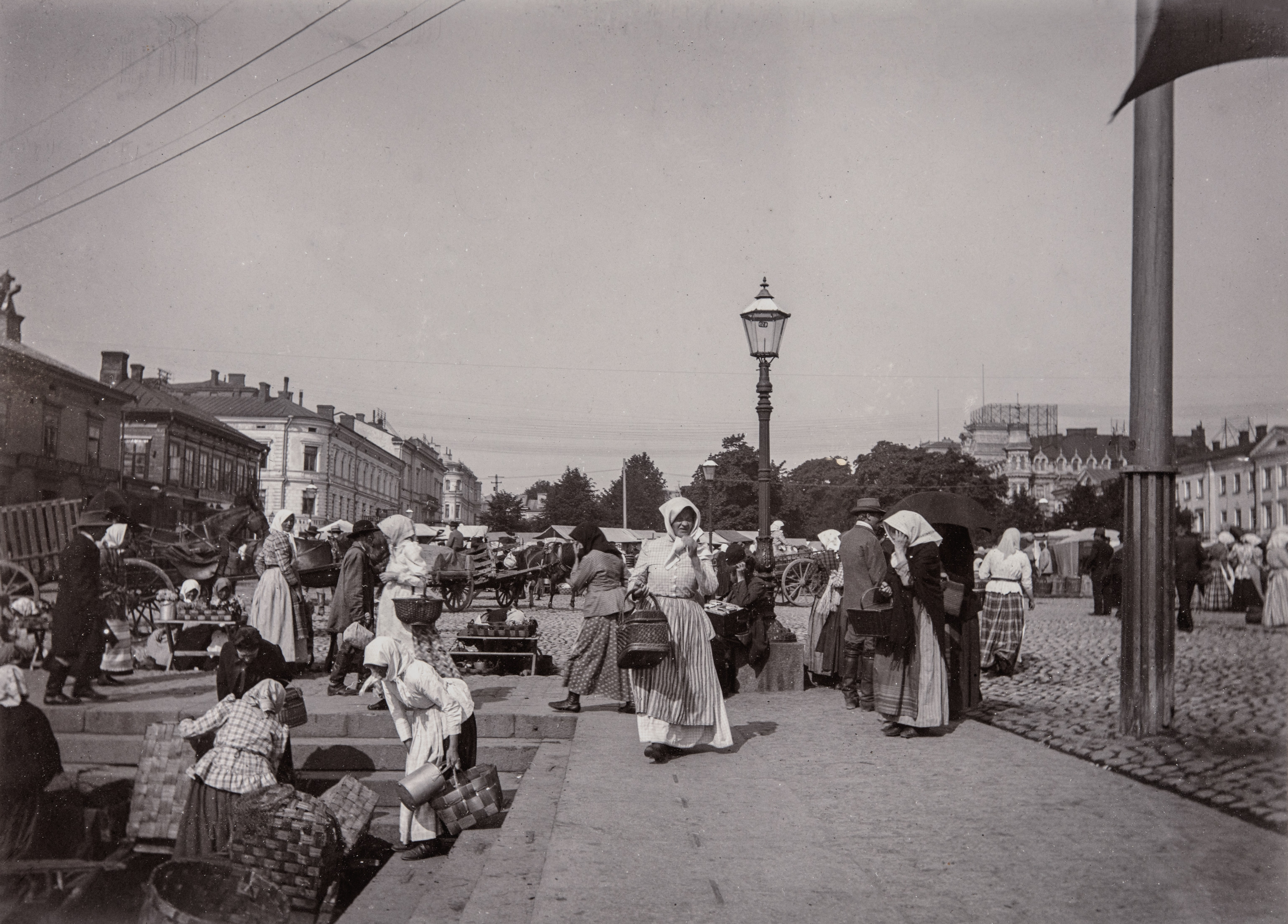
Monochrome picture of Helsinki's Market Square from the 1890s

Although methods for photographing in color emerged slowly starting in the 1850s, monochrome imagery dominated photography until the mid–twentieth century. From the start, photographic recording processes such as the daguerreotype, the paper negative and the glass collodion negative did not render the color of light (although they were sensitive to some colors more than others). The result was a monochrome image.

Until the 1880s, photographic processes that were used for printing negatives—such as calotype, ambrotype, tintype, salt print and the albumen print—generally produced images with a variety of brown or sepia tones. Later processes moved toward a black-and-white image, although photographers have used toning solutions to convert silver in the image to silver sulphide, imparting a brown or sepia tone. Similarly, selenium toner produces a blue-black or purple image by converting silver into more stable silver selenide. Cyanotypes use iron salts rather than silver salts, producing blue images.

Most modern black-and-white films, called panchromatic films, record the entire visible spectrum. Some films are orthochromatic, recording visible light wavelengths shorter than 590 nanometers, in the blue to green range of the spectrum and are less sensitive to the longer wavelength range (i.e. orange-red) of the visible spectrum.

== Modern techniques and uses ==
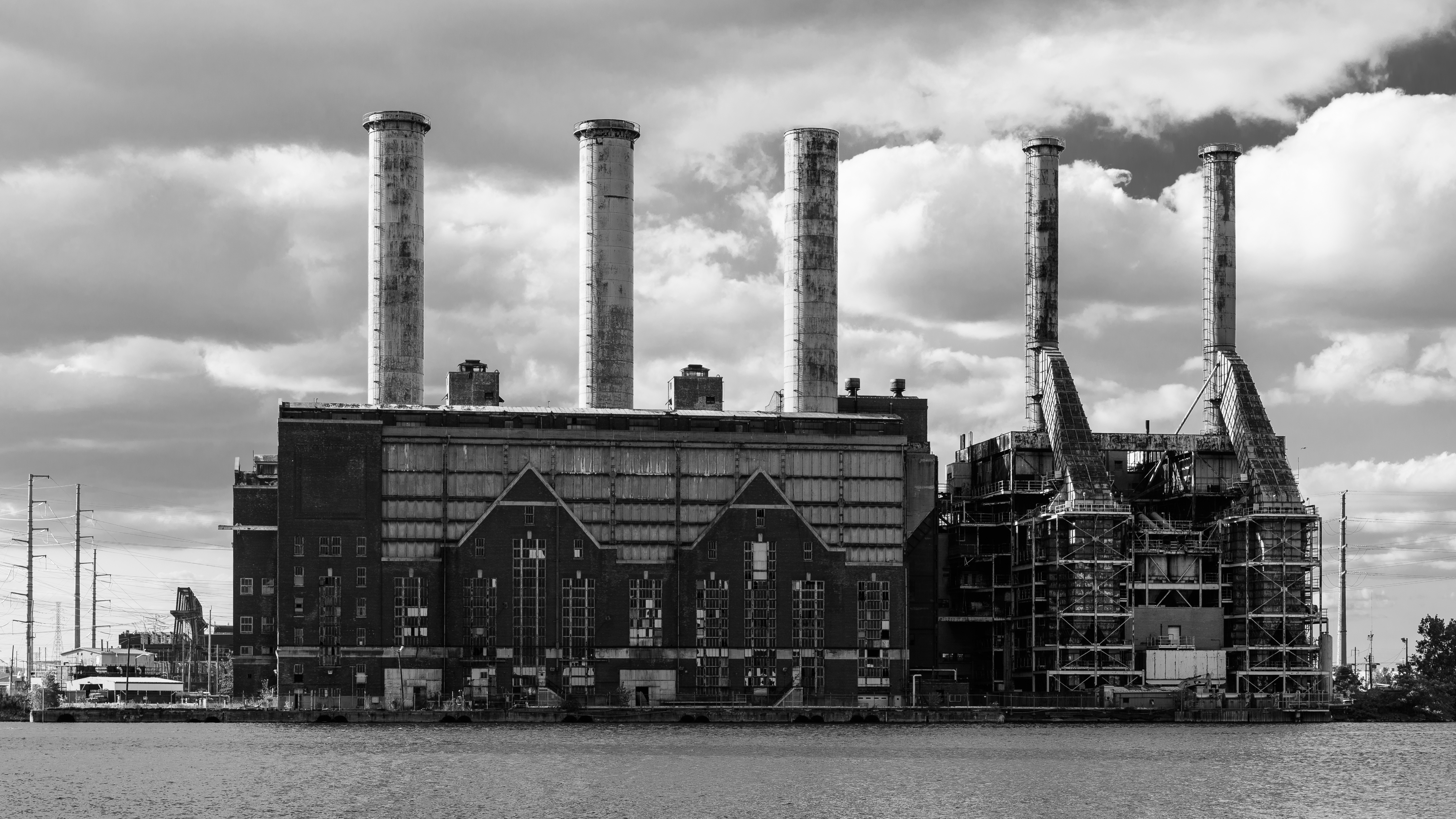
Digital photo of Kearny Generating Station, converted to black and white in Lightroom, with color channels adjusted to mimic the effect of a red filter.

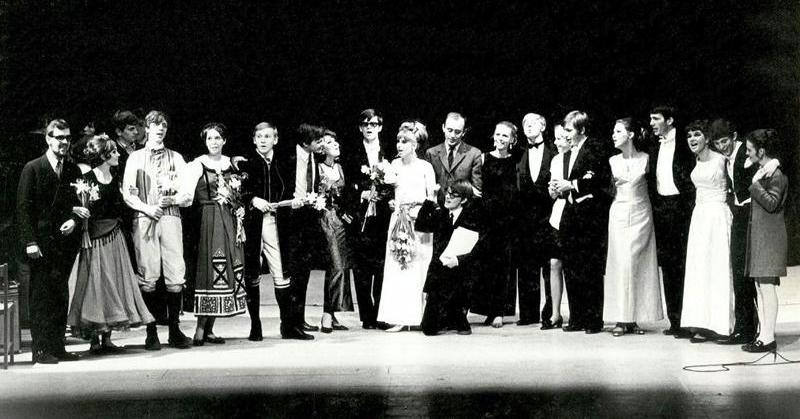
1968 group portrait of a Swedish musical's cast

Black-and-white photography is considered by some to be more subtle and interpretive, and less realistic than color photography. Monochrome images are not direct renditions of their subjects, but are abstractions from reality, representing colors in shades of grey. In computer terms, this is often called greyscale. Black-and-white photography is considered by some to add a more emotional touch to the subject, compared with the original colored photography.

Monochrome images may be produced in a number of ways. Finding and capturing a scene having only variants of a certain hue, while difficult and uncommon in practice, will result in an image that technically qualifies as a monochrome photo. One can also artificially limit the range of color in a photo to those within a certain hue by using black-and-white film or paper, or by manipulating color images using computer software.

Color images can be converted to black and white on the computer using several methods, including desaturating the existing color RGB image so that no color remains visible (which still allows color channels to be manipulated to alter tones such as darkening a blue sky), or by converting the image to a greyscale version (which eliminates the colors permanently), using software programs like Photoshop. After software conversion to a monochrome image, one or more hues can replace the grey tones to emulate duotones, sepia, selenium or gold toned images or cyanotype, calotype or albumen prints.

== Digital black-and-white cameras ==
Although digital images captured in color can be modified with a digital black and white process, some specialized cameras photograph natively in black and white with no option for color.

Black and white digital cameras are often designed without a Bayer filter, avoiding the demosaicing process and meaning that a camera will only capture raw luminance. This allows these specialized cameras to capture the full spectrum of available light.

Some feature films, including Blonde, were shot using specialized digital video equipment designed without a Bayer filter — rather than black and white film — in order to enable longer takes.

Leica M Monochrom is a digital camera in Leica Camera AG's rangefinder M series, and features a monochrome sensor. The camera was announced in May 2012.

Phase One IQ3 100MP Achromatic is a digital medium format camera with an ISO rating exceeding up to 51,200. The camera was released in 2017.

The Pentax K3 Mark III was released as a monochromatic version in 2023 to high demand.

The Ricoh GR IV Monochrome was announced October 2025.

== Monochromatic modifiers ==
The use of the following modifiers can add a different aesthetic to images without software manipulation, each for their own unique purposes:

- Color filters
- Neutral density filters (gradual or standard ND filters)
- Polarizing filters
- Infrared filter

== Astrophotography applications ==
Monochrome imaging for astrophotography is a popular technique among amateur astrophotographers. Modern monochrome cameras dispose of the color bayer matrix that sits in front of the sensor. This allows for specialized narrowband filters to be used, allowing the entire sensor area to be utilized for specific wavelengths of light emitted by many deep space objects. Hydrogen-alpha, a common wavelength used, is red in color. and only the red pixels, approximately 25% of the sensor, will detect this light. In a monochrome camera, the whole sensor can be used to detect this signal. Monochrome photography is also useful in areas of high light pollution.

== Image gallery ==
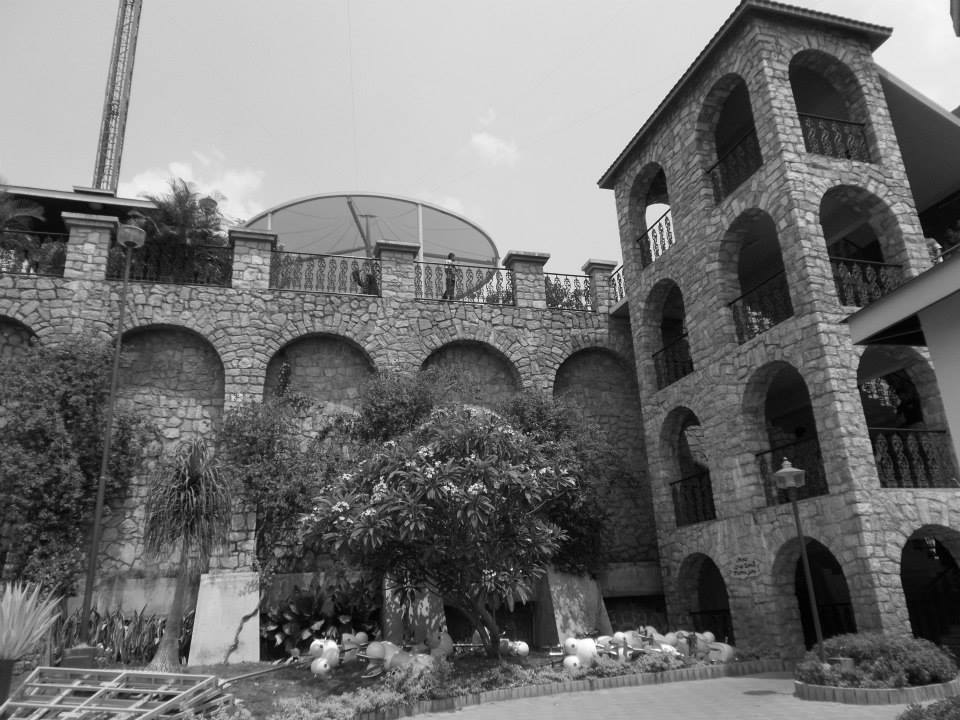
Black and white image

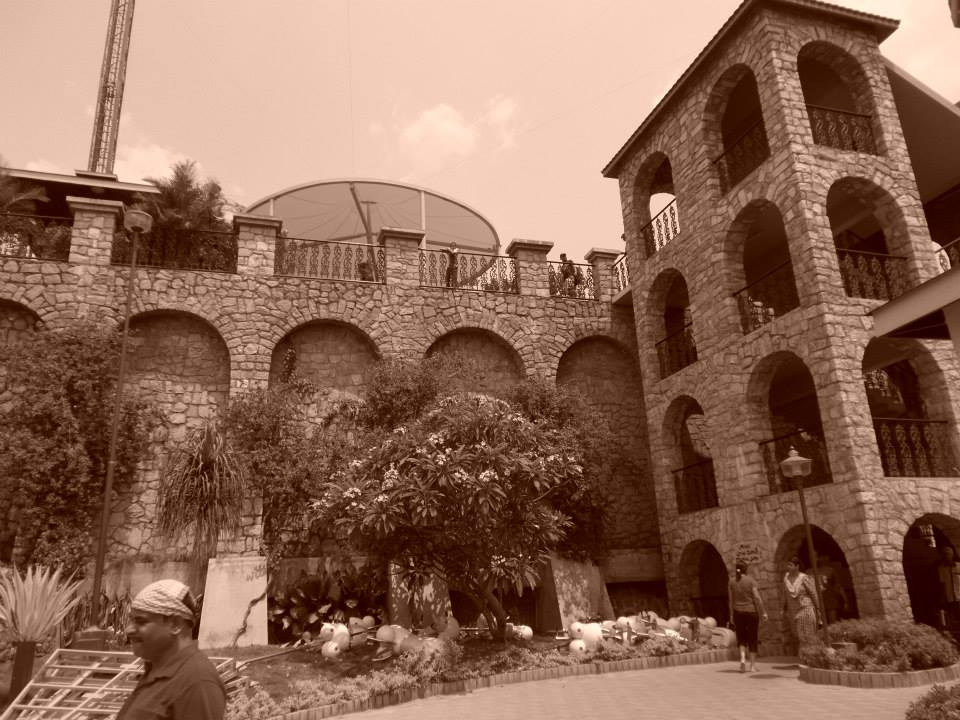
Digitally toned sepia image

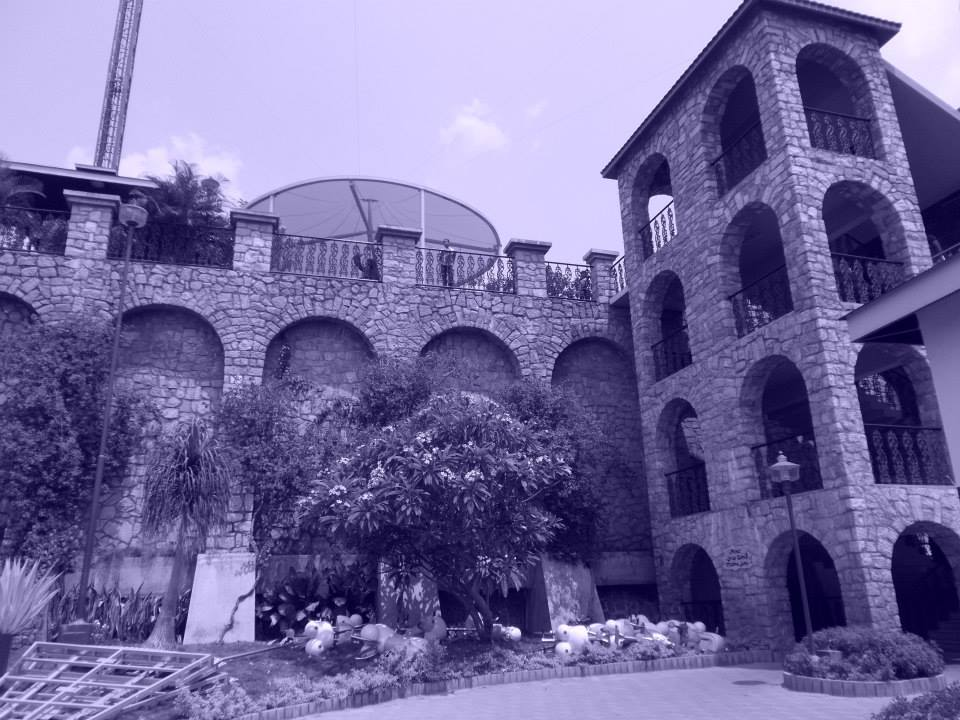
Digitally toned cyanotype image

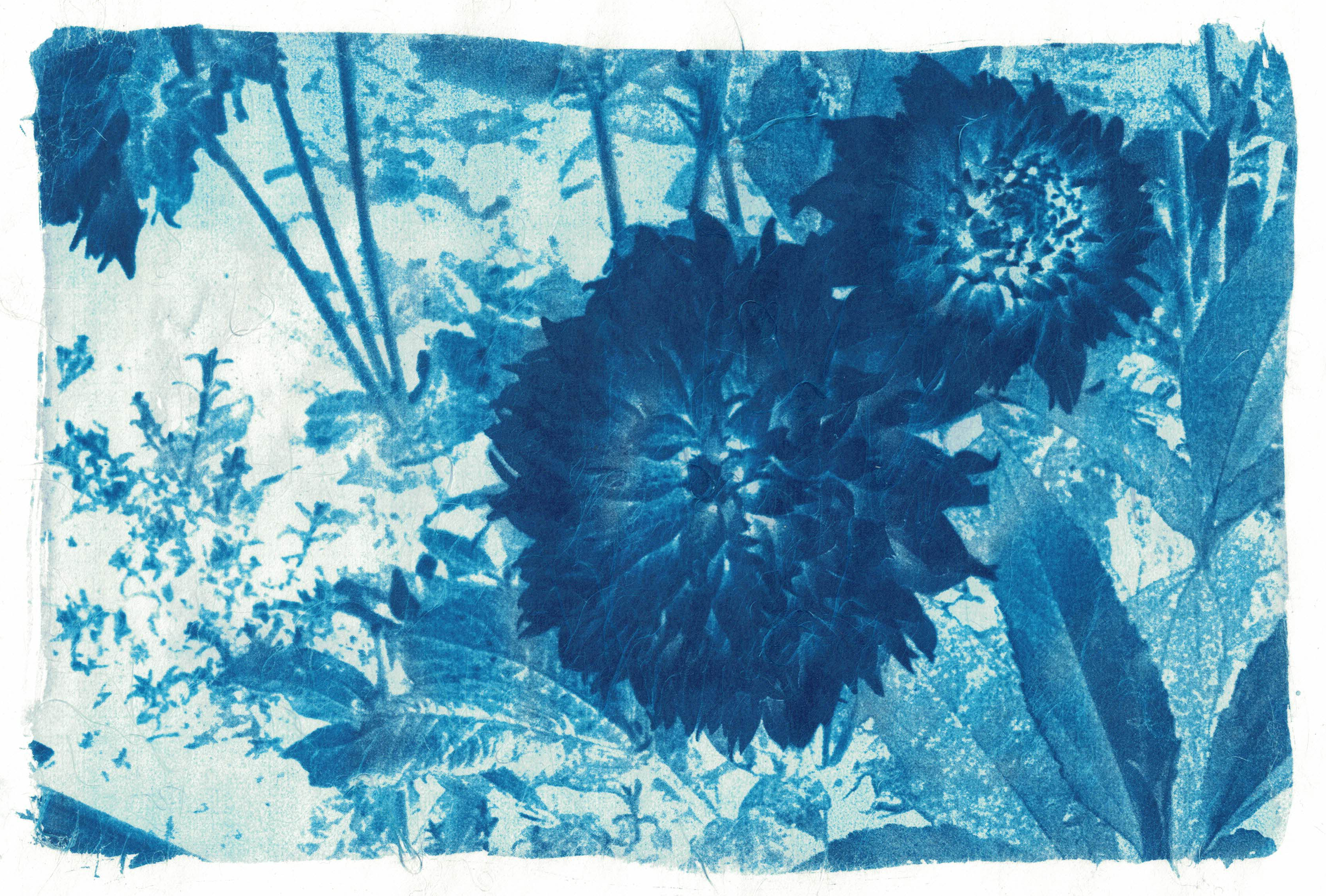
Cyanotype by Darkroom Processing

== See also ==
- List of photographs considered the most important
- Ruh khitch
- Black and white
- Cyanotype
- Ambrotype
- Calotype
