= Sh 2-155 =

H II region in the constellation Cepheus

Emission nebula
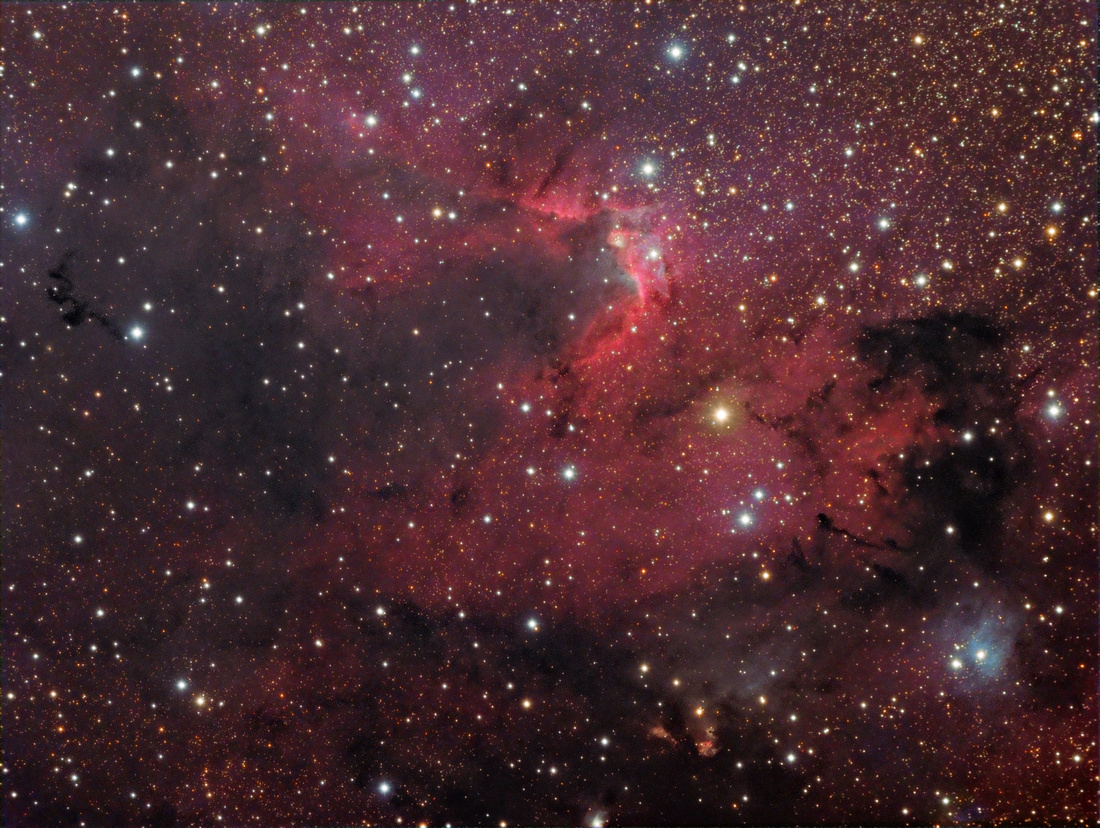
- Sh 2–155

Observation data: J2000.0 epoch
- Right ascension: 22^{h} 57^{m} 17.14^{s}
- Declination: +62° 28′ 33.4"
- Distance: 2400 ly
- Apparent magnitude (V): 7.7
- Apparent dimensions (V): 50.0'x30.0'
- Constellation: Cepheus

Physical characteristics
- Radius: 35 ly
- Absolute magnitude (V): 16
- Designations: Sh 2-155, Caldwell 9, LBN 110.11+02.44

Sh 2-155 (also designated Caldwell 9, Sharpless 155 or S155, or LBN529) is a diffuse nebula in the constellation Cepheus, within a larger nebula complex containing emission, reflection, and dark nebulosity. It is widely known as the Cave Nebula, though that name was applied earlier to Ced 201, a different nebula in Cepheus. Sh 2-155 is an ionized H II region with ongoing star formation activity, at an estimated distance of 725 parsecs (2400 light-years) from Earth.

Sh 2-155 was first noted as a galactic emission nebula in 1959 in the extended second edition of the Sharpless catalogue, being a part of the much larger Cep OB3 Association. Although Sh 2-155 is relatively faint for amateur observation, some of its structure may be seen visually through a moderately sized telescope under dark skies.

Sh 2-155 lies at the edge of the Cepheus B cloud (part of the Cepheus molecular cloud), and is ionized by young stars from the Cep OB3 association. It has been suggested that radiation from the hot O-type star HD 217086 is compressing the region, triggering the formation of a new generation of stars. A study of the region's young stellar objects by the Chandra X-ray Observatory and Spitzer Space Telescope shows a progression of stellar ages in front of the cloud, supporting the hypothesis of triggered star-formation.

== Other name designations ==
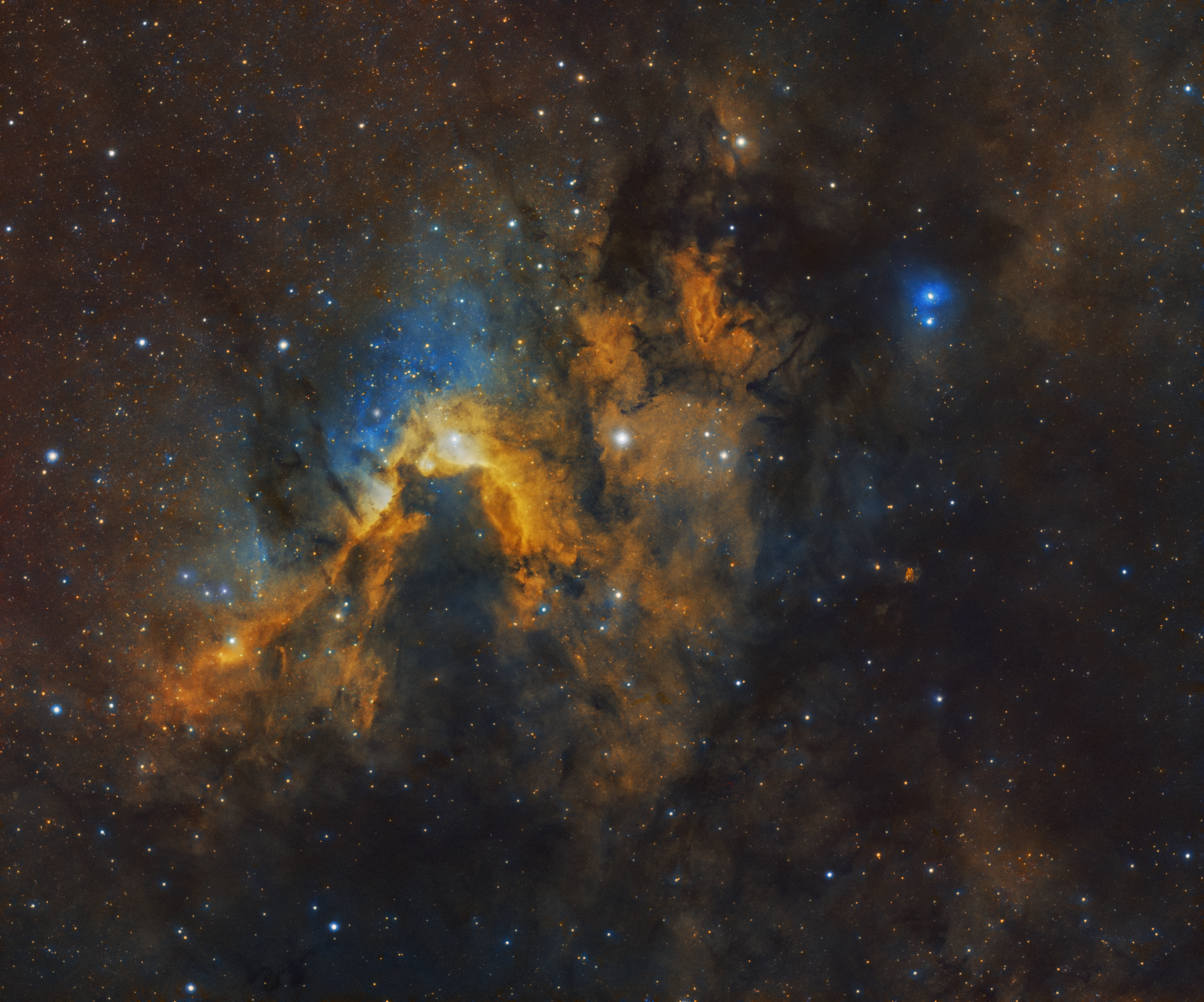
Amateur photograph of the Cave Nebula in the Hubble palette

The name "Cave Nebula" was coined for this object by Patrick Moore, presumably derived from photographic images showing a curved arc of emission nebulosity corresponding to a cave mouth. The name was also used earlier to refer to another brighter but unrelated reflection nebula in Cepheus known as Ced 201 or VdB 152, positioned at R.A.: 22h 13m 27s Dec.: +70° 15′ 18″ (2000). The name's application to Sh 2-155 has come into vogue through the nebula's inclusion in Moore's Caldwell catalogue as object Caldwell 9. (SIMBAD lists the name for Ced 201, but not for Sh 2-155.)
