= Cepheus B =

Molecular cloud and star-forming region in the constellation Cepheus

Molecular cloud
- Image of Cepheus B. The Cepheus OB3 association is the group of stars north out of frame.

Observation data: J2000 epoch
- Right ascension: 22^{h} 57^{m} 7.00^{s}
- Declination: +62° 37′ 22.3″
- Distance: ~2,400 ly
- Constellation: Cepheus
- Designations: [BSM2002] 22551+6221 1, JCMTSE J225707.2+623726, JCMTSF J225707.2+623726, Cep B, Cepheus B Cloud

Cepheus B (Cep B) is a molecular cloud and star-forming region located about 2,400 ly away in the constellation Cepheus. The H II region Sh 2-155 is a component of this molecular cloud.

The cloud features a central spin-like filamentary structure and a bright core at its northern tip, which also contains Sh 2-155. Hot material within the molecular cloud like the [C II] emission and ¹³CO/C¹⁸O ratios seem to be affected on large scales by a gradual change mostly originating from the Sh 2-155 H II region via material photoevaporation from the molecular cloud. One study found that radiative star formation might work only on small scales and cannot explain large-scale star birth. Another study found that the density and temperature at the edge of the cloud are higher than at the center, suggesting that radiation-driven star formation does occur in Cepheus B on large scales.

A study identified approximately 400, 1 million year old pre-main-sequence (PMS) stars, 354 of which possess circumstellar disks. These younger disk-bearing stars are concentrated around the core of the molecular cloud, while older stars are dispersed north in the direction of the O7-type star HD 217086. These stars are 3 to 5 million years old, with 30% retaining disks. These PMS stars are concentrated in two major clusters, the Cepheus OB3b association containing 321 stars and an embedded cluster of 64 stars. Another ~400 PMS stars are all grouped into multiple small obscured and unobscured clusters throughout Cepheus B.

The previously mentioned long filamentary structure that extends from the head to the bottom like a spine is fragmenting due to gravity, though this is regulated by the magnetic fields (B-fields) of other nearby objects. The bright core in the north appears to resist the direct compression from the ionization front of the filamentary structure, maintaining its structural integrity. Observations indicate that the edge of the hotspot features a blister that has created a cavity, a near-IR star at the center of the blister is responsible for heating the hotspot. The hotspot triggers the formation of nearby star clusters without the need for OB stars exploding. The temperature of the molecular cloud is 70K in the west down to 40K in the east.
