= WR 136 =

Star in the constellation of Cygnus

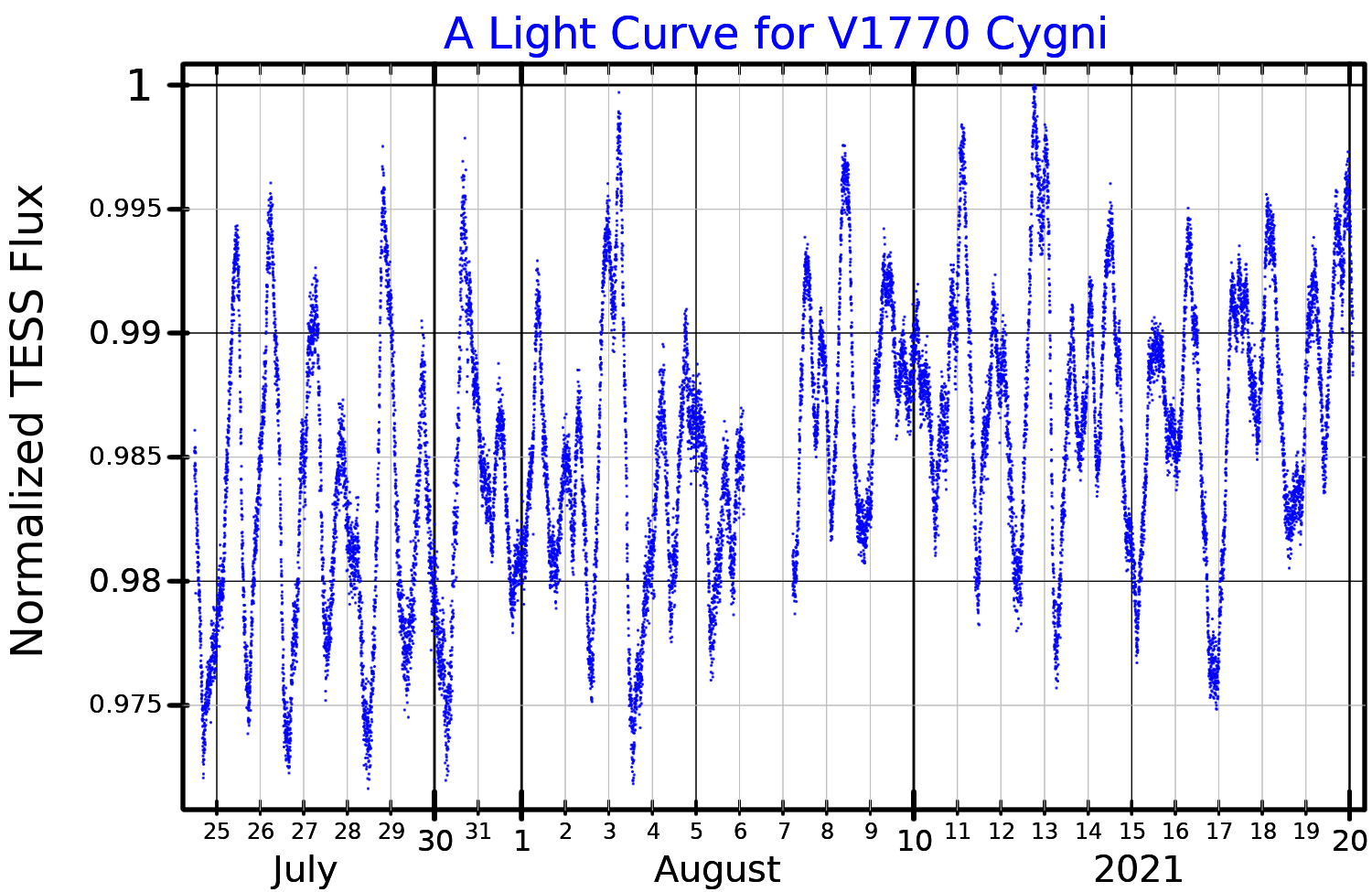
- A light curve for V1770 Cygni, plotted from TESS data

Observation data Epoch J2000 Equinox ICRS
- Constellation: Cygnus
- Right ascension: 20^{h} 12^{m} 06.5421^{s}
- Declination: +38° 21′ 17.779″
- Apparent magnitude (V): 7.50

Characteristics
- Evolutionary stage: Wolf–Rayet
- Spectral type: WN6(h)-s
- U−B color index: −0.37
- B−V color index: +0.01

Astrometry
Radial velocity (R_{v})	−21.6 km/s
Proper motion (μ)	RA: −7.54 mas/yr Dec.: −7.38 mas/yr
Parallax (π)	0.4865±0.0337 mas
Distance	6,700 ± 500 ly (2,100 ± 100 pc)
Absolute magnitude (M_{V})	−5.63

Details
Mass	21 M_{☉}
Radius	5.10 R_{☉}
Luminosity	600,000 L_{☉}
Temperature	70,800 K
Rotation	37 km/s
Age	4.7 Myr

Other designations
- V1770 Cyg, AG+38 1977, GSC 03151-01765, BD+37 3821, HD 192163, HIP 99546, GC 28056, SAO 69592.

Database references
SIMBAD	data

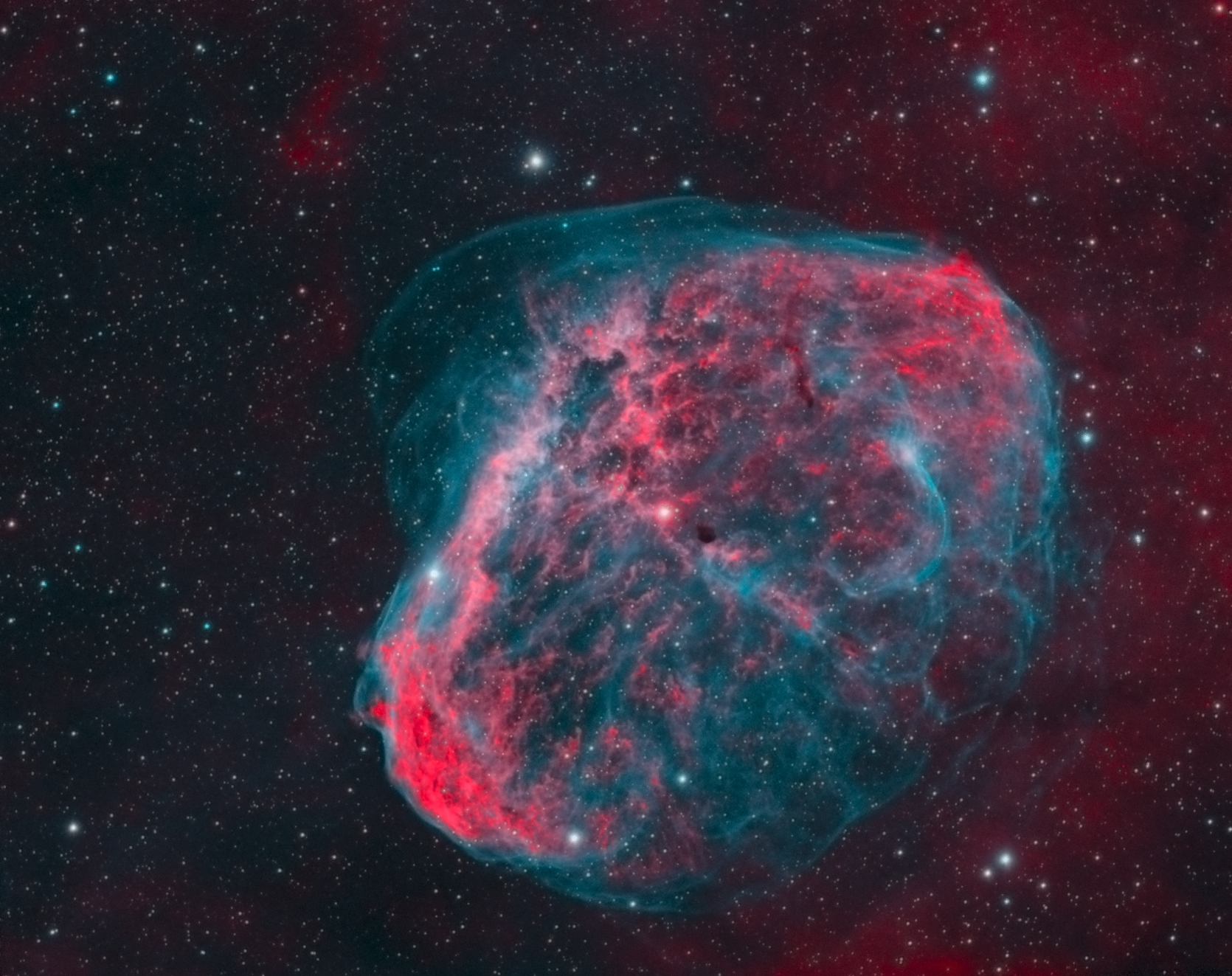
WR 136 at the centre of NGC 6888

WR 136 is a Wolf–Rayet star located in the constellation Cygnus. It is in the center of the Crescent Nebula. Its age is estimated to be around 4.7 million years and it is nearing the end of its life. Within a few hundred thousand years, it is expected to explode as a supernova.

According to recent estimations, WR 136 is 600,000 times brighter than the Sun, 21 times more massive, and 5.1 times larger. Its surface temperature is around 70,000 kelvins.

WR 136 blew off a shell of material with a mass of around 5 M_{☉} when it became a red supergiant around 120,000–240,000 years ago and this is still expanding at 80 km/s. Currently, its fast stellar wind, ejected from the star at around 3.8 million mph (1,700 km/s), is catching up to the material ejected from the star and shaping it into a shell. Ultraviolet rays emitted from WR 136's hot surface cause the shell to glow.

There is some evidence WR 136 may be a binary star. Its companion would be a low-mass star of spectral classification K or M that would complete an orbit around the Wolf-Rayet star each 5.13 days, being the progenitor of a low-mass X-ray binary system.
