= Soap Bubble Nebula =

Planetary nebula in the constellation Cygnus

Emission nebula
- Planetary nebula
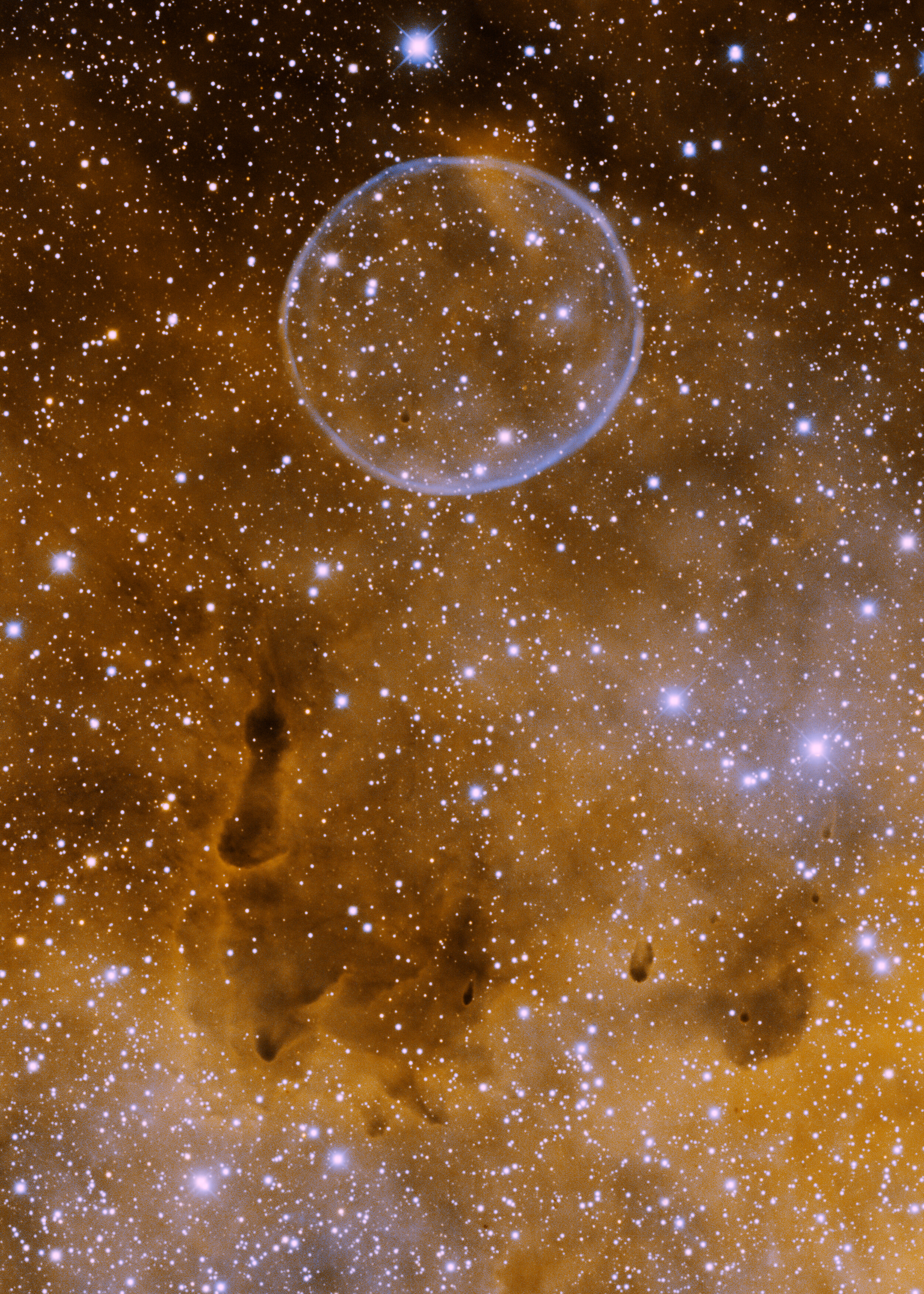

Observation data: J2000 epoch
- Right ascension: 20^{h} 15^{m} 22.2^{s}
- Declination: +38° 02′ 58″
- Apparent dimensions (V): 260″
- Constellation: Cygnus
- Designations: PN G075.5+01.7, PN Ju 1

The Soap Bubble Nebula, Ju 1 (also known as PN G075.5+01.7) is a planetary nebula in the constellation Cygnus, near the Crescent Nebula (NGC 6888). The nebula derives its name from its symmetrical spherical shape which resembles a soap bubble.

== Discovery ==
It was discovered by amateur astronomer Dave Jurasevich using an Astro-Physics 160 mm refractor telescope with which he imaged the nebula on June 19, 2007 and on July 6, 2008. The nebula was later independently noted and reported to the International Astronomical Union by Keith B. Quattrocchi and Mel Helm who imaged PN G75.5+1.7 on July 17, 2008. The nebula measures 260″ in angular diameter with a central star that has a J band magnitude of 19.45.

Due to the faintness of the nebula and the fact that it is embedded in a diffuse nebula, it was difficult to discover.

== See also ==
- Cygnus Molecular Nebula Complex
