= Embedded cluster =

Star clusters surrounded by molecular clouds

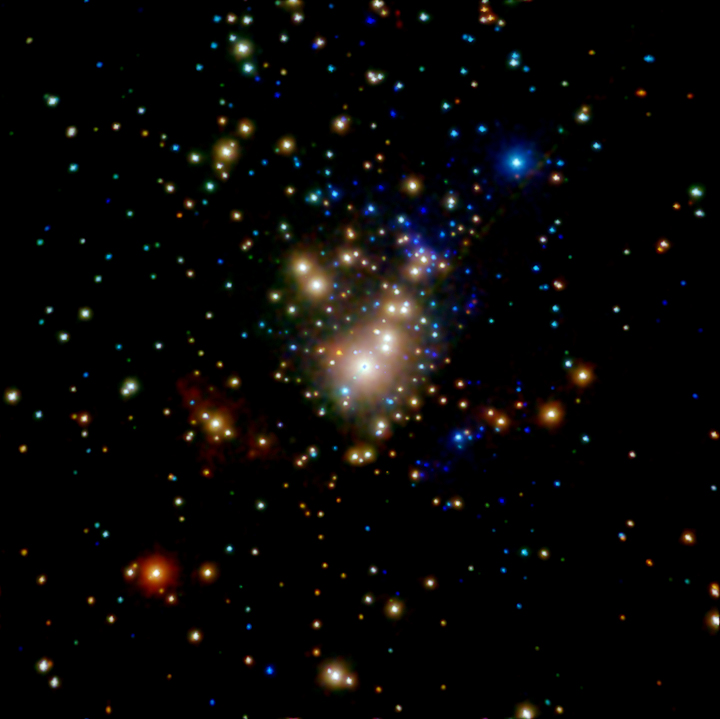
X-ray view of Orion showing the Trapezium embedded cluster.

Embedded stellar clusters, or simply embedded clusters (EC), are open clusters that are still surrounded by their progenitor molecular cloud. They are often areas of active star formation, giving rise to stellar objects that have similar ages and compositions. Because of the dense material that surrounds the stars, they appear obscured in visible light but can be observed using other sections of the electromagnetic spectrum, such as the near-infrared and X-rays that can see through the cloud material. In the Milky Way Galaxy, embedded clusters can mostly be found within the Galactic disk or near the Galactic Center where most of the star-formation activity is happening.

The sizes of stellar objects born in embedded clusters may be distributed according to initial mass function, with many low-mass stars formed for every high-mass star. Nevertheless, the high-mass stars of temperature class O and B, which are significantly hotter and more luminous than the low-mass stars, have a disproportionate effect on their interstellar environment by ionizing the gas surrounding them creating H II regions. Many ultra-compact H II regions, the precursors to massive protostars, are associated with embedded clusters.

Over time, radiation pressure and accretion of the remaining gas and dust surrounding the stellar objects, will disperse the molecular cloud and give rise to the better known open cluster.

Several famous embedded clusters include the Trapezium Cluster in the Orion Nebula, L1688 in the Rho Ophiuchi cloud complex, NGC 2244 in the Rosette Nebula, the cluster in the Trifid Nebula, NGC 6611 in the Eagle Nebula, and Trumpler 14, 15, and 16 in the Carina Nebula.
