= Ruh khitch =

Punjabi photography term

Ruh khitch, translated from Punjabi as 'Spirit Pulling', refers to the way the photographer puts his hand inside the purpose built camera containing a mobile darkroom and pulls out the photograph.

Traditional ruh khitch is a way in which black-and-white photographs can be taken, printed and sold to a client without a studio or darkroom. It was practised throughout the twentieth century, mostly in South Asia by photographers who worked on the pavement near government offices (where passport size portraits were needed), and at tourist attractions like the Bhatti Gate of the walled city of Lahore. It was also practiced in Havana, Cuba, especially on the steps of the capitol building; see Laura Gooch "Instant Street Photos, Havana Style," Popular Photography, March 2000.

== Technical details ==
The camera is just large enough to contain a focusing screen and two trays of photographic chemicals; developer and fixer. This mini darkroom/camera combo allows an image to be shot, on photographic paper, and processed within two minutes. Being able to judge the exposure by examining the negative is an important feature in a camera that has no shutter. The lenses usually came from an old enlarger and the exposure times are typically between 1 and 4 seconds. This means all photographs are taken with the cooperation of the subject who has to remain as still as possible during the exposure. As with many old photographic processes that had long exposure times, a kind of neck brace was employed to aid the subjects to remain still.

== History ==
There is very little documentation of the history of ruh khitch and its often prolific exponents. The photographer Malcolm Hutcheson, who has a long history of working in Pakistan, has collected the cameras and any images he finds for over ten years which he used to curate an international exhibition on the subject. He researched and collected the work of three photographers, Gogi Pehlwan (also a famous wrestler) and Amin Naveed of Bhatti Gate, Lahore and Babba Bhutta of Sheikhupura. Their combined work gives an indication of how the majority of Punjabis saw themselves over the last 50 years of the century. All three of these photographers started working in the 1950s until around the turn of the century when digital photography finally brought the technique to an end. Malcolm Hutcheson is also the only modern practitioner of ruh khitch photography using the technique to tackle subjects of the environment and human rights.

"I use digital means to make my prints or print negatives that are then printed on hand made photographic paper. I do all stages of the processing myself.The camera with a darkroom inside allows me to abandon using a light meter as I can proof the negatives as soon as they are shot. I sense the exposure and each photograph is based on my judgement of all the elements that make the photograph."

In 2008, Malcolm Hutcheson was nominated for the Prix Pictet, the world's premier photographic award in sustainability with a series of ruh khitch photographs taken on the subject of the water and sewage systems of Lahore.
