= Van den Bergh Catalog =

Astronomy catalogue

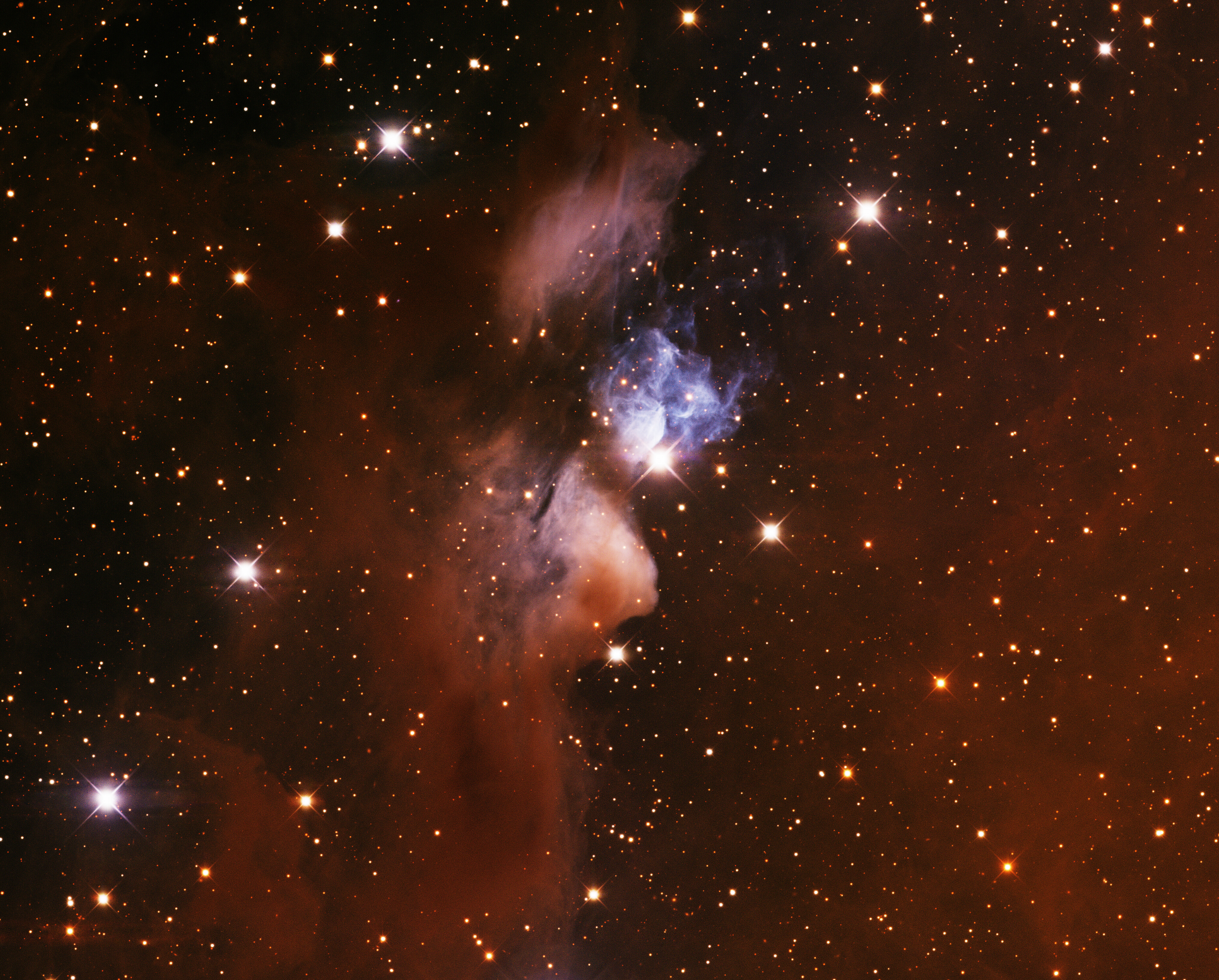
Image of vdB 24 Nebula

This astronomical catalog is a list of reflection nebulae composed by astronomer Sidney van den Bergh.

The data of these tables are from the SIMBAD Astronomical Database unless otherwise stated.

== Table ==
S No.	common name	Images	Related Star	Names and designations
vdB 1			HD 627 (B7V)	LBN 578, Magakian 3
vdB 4			BD+61 154 (B8eq)	
vdB 8			HD 17443 (B9V)	
vdB 9			SU Cassiopeiae (F5.5III+)	
vdB 14			HD 21291 (B9Ia)	
vdB 15			HD 21389 (A0Ia)	
vdB 16			BD+29 565 (F0V)	
vdB 24			XY Persei (A2II+B6)	
vdB 30			Alpha Camelopardalis (O9Ia)	
vdB 31			AB Aurigae (A0Ve)	
vdB 37			V1057 Orionis (M2II-III)	
vdB 38			HD 34989 (B1V)	
vdB 42			HD 36412 (kA7hF1VmF3)	
vdB 47			HD 37387 (K2Ib)	
vdB 49			Omega Orionis (B3Ve)	
vdB 67	NGC 2170		BD-06 1415 (B1)	
vdB 93			HD 53367 (B0IV/Ve)	
vdB 94			HD 53623 (B1II/III)	
vdB 98			HD 61071 (B2III)	
vdB 105			HD 147889 (B2V)	
vdB 106			Rho Ophiuchi (B2IV+B2V)	
vdB 141	Ghost Nebula		BD+67 1300 (G8)	
vdB 142			HD 239710 (B3V)	
vdB 149			BD+72 1018 (B8V)	LDN 1235
vdB 150			HD 210806 (B8IV)	
vdB 152	Barnard 175		BD+69 1231 (B9.5V)	
vdB 155			HD 216629 (B3IVe+A3)	
vdB 158			HD 222142 (B8V)	LBN 534

== List ==
- vdB 1
- vdB 2
- vdB 3
- vdB 4
- vdB 5
- vdB 6
- vdB 7
- vdB 8
- vdB 9
- vdB 10
- vdB 11
- vdB 12
- vdB 13
- vdB 14
- vdB 15
- vdB 16
- vdB 17
- vdB 18
- vdB 19
- vdB 20
- vdB 21
- vdB 22
- vdB 23
- vdB 24
- vdB 25
- vdB 26
- vdB 27
- vdB 28
- vdB 29
- vdB 30
- vdB 31
- vdB 32
- vdB 33
- vdB 34
- vdB 35
- vdB 36
- vdB 37
- vdB 38
- vdB 39
- vdB 40
- vdB 41
- vdB 42
- vdB 43
- vdB 44
- vdB 45
- vdB 46
- vdB 47
- vdB 48
- vdB 49
- vdB 50
- vdB 51
- vdB 52
- vdB 53
- vdB 54
- vdB 55
- vdB 56
- vdB 57
- vdB 58
- vdB 59
- vdB 60
- vdB 61
- vdB 62
- vdB 63
- vdB 64
- vdB 65
- vdB 66
- vdB 67
- vdB 68
- vdB 69
- vdB 70
- vdB 71
- vdB 72
- vdB 73
- vdB 74
- vdB 75
- vdB 76
- vdB 77
- vdB 78
- vdB 79
- vdB 80
- vdB 81
- vdB 82
- vdB 83
- vdB 84
- vdB 85
- vdB 86
- vdB 87
- vdB 88
- vdB 89
- vdB 90
- vdB 91
- vdB 92
- vdB 93
- vdB 94
- vdB 95
- vdB 96
- vdB 97
- vdB 98
- vdB 99
- vdB 100
- vdB 101
- vdB 102
- vdB 103
- vdB 104
- vdB 105
- vdB 106
- vdB 107
- vdB 108
- vdB 109
- vdB 110
- vdB 111
- vdB 112
- vdB 113
- vdB 114
- vdB 115
- vdB 116
- vdB 117
- vdB 118
- vdB 119
- vdB 120
- vdB 121
- vdB 122
- vdB 123
- vdB 124
- vdB 125
- vdB 126
- vdB 127
- vdB 128
- vdB 129
- vdB 130
- vdB 131
- vdB 132
- vdB 133
- vdB 134
- vdB 135
- vdB 136
- vdB 137
- vdB 138
- vdB 139
- vdB 140
- vdB 141
- vdB 142
- vdB 143
- vdB 144
- vdB 145
- vdB 146
- vdB 147
- vdB 148
- vdB 149
- vdB 150
- vdB 151
- vdB 152
- vdB 153
- vdB 154
- vdB 155
- vdB 156
- vdB 157
- vdB 158

== Star chart ==
Chart of van den Bergh reflection nebulae

== See also ==
- Sharpless Catalog
- Gum Catalog
- RCW Catalog
