= NGC 2080 =

Emission nebula in the constellation Dorado

Emission nebula
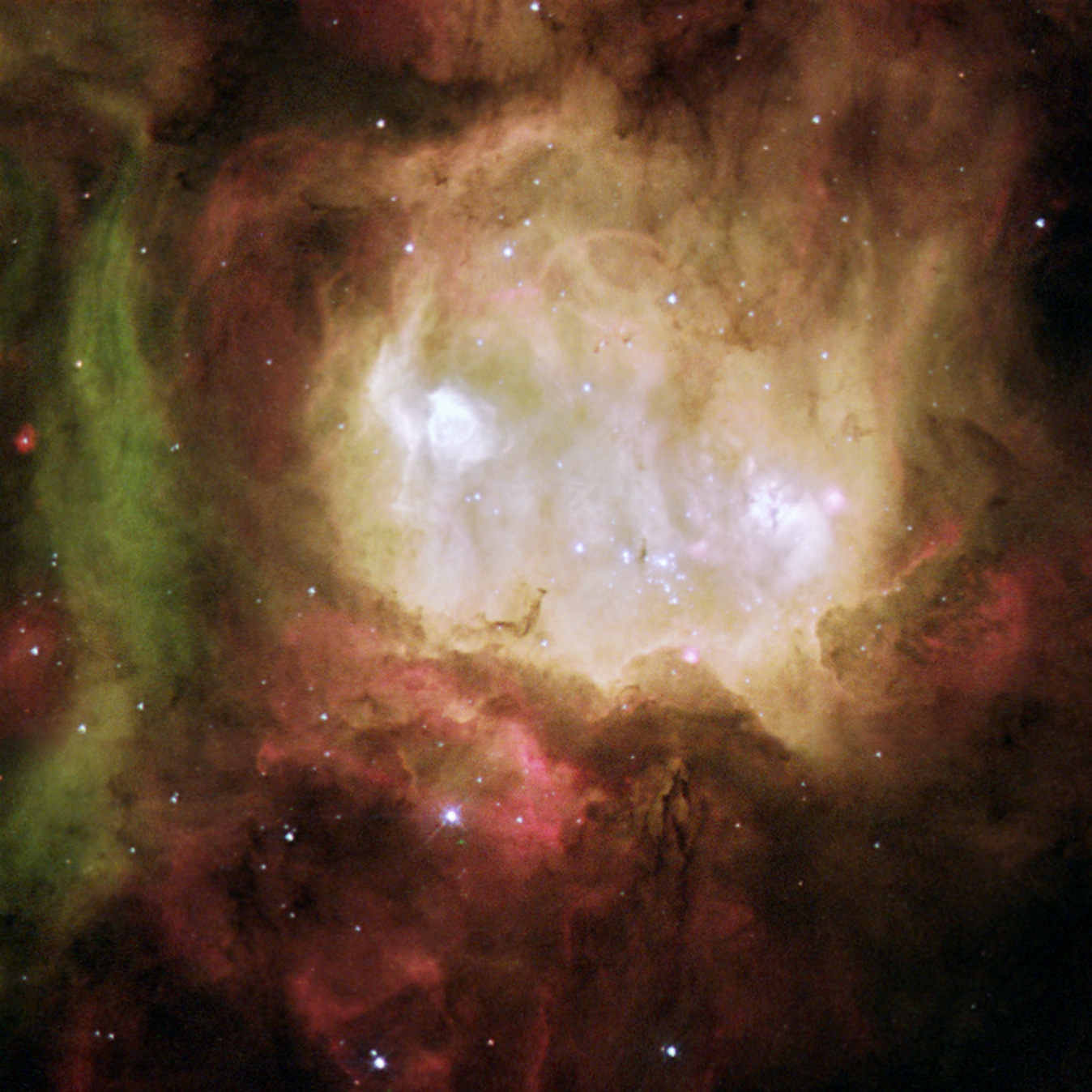
- A HST image of a Star-forming region NGC 2080.

Observation data: J2000.0 epoch
- Right ascension: 05^{h} 39^{m} 44.2^{s}
- Declination: −69° 38′ 44″
- Distance: 160,000 ly
- Constellation: Dorado
- Designations: ESO 057-EN012, h 2950, GC 1278

NGC 2080, also known as the Ghost Head Nebula, is a star-forming region and emission nebula to the south of the 30 Doradus (Tarantula) nebula, in the southern constellation Dorado. It belongs to the Large Magellanic Cloud, a satellite galaxy to the Milky Way, which is at a distance of 168,000 light years. NGC 2080 was discovered by John Frederick William Herschel in 1834.

The Ghost Head Nebula has a diameter of 50 light-years and is named for the two distinct white patches it possesses, called the "eyes of the ghost". The western patch, called A1, has a bubble in the center which was created by the young, massive star it contains. The eastern patch, called A2, has several young stars in a newly formed cluster, but they are still obscured by their originating dust cloud. Because neither dust cloud has dissipated due to the stellar radiation, astronomers have deduced that both sets of stars formed within the past 10,000 years. These stars together have begun to create a bubble in the nebula with their outpourings of material, called stellar wind.

The presence of stars also greatly influences the color of the nebula. The western portion of the nebula has a dominant oxygen emission line because of a powerful star on the nebula's outskirts; this colors it green. The rest of the nebula's outskirts have a red hue due to the ionization of hydrogen. Because both hydrogen and oxygen are ionized in the central region, it appears pale yellow; when hydrogen is energized enough to emit a second wavelength of light, it appears blue, as in the area surrounding A1 and A2.

NGC 2080 should not be confused with the Ghost Nebula (Sh2-136) or the Little Ghost Nebula (NGC 6369).

== See also ==
- List of NGC objects (2001–3000)
