= Little Ghost Nebula =

Planetary nebula in the constellation Ophiuchus

Emission nebula
- Planetary nebula
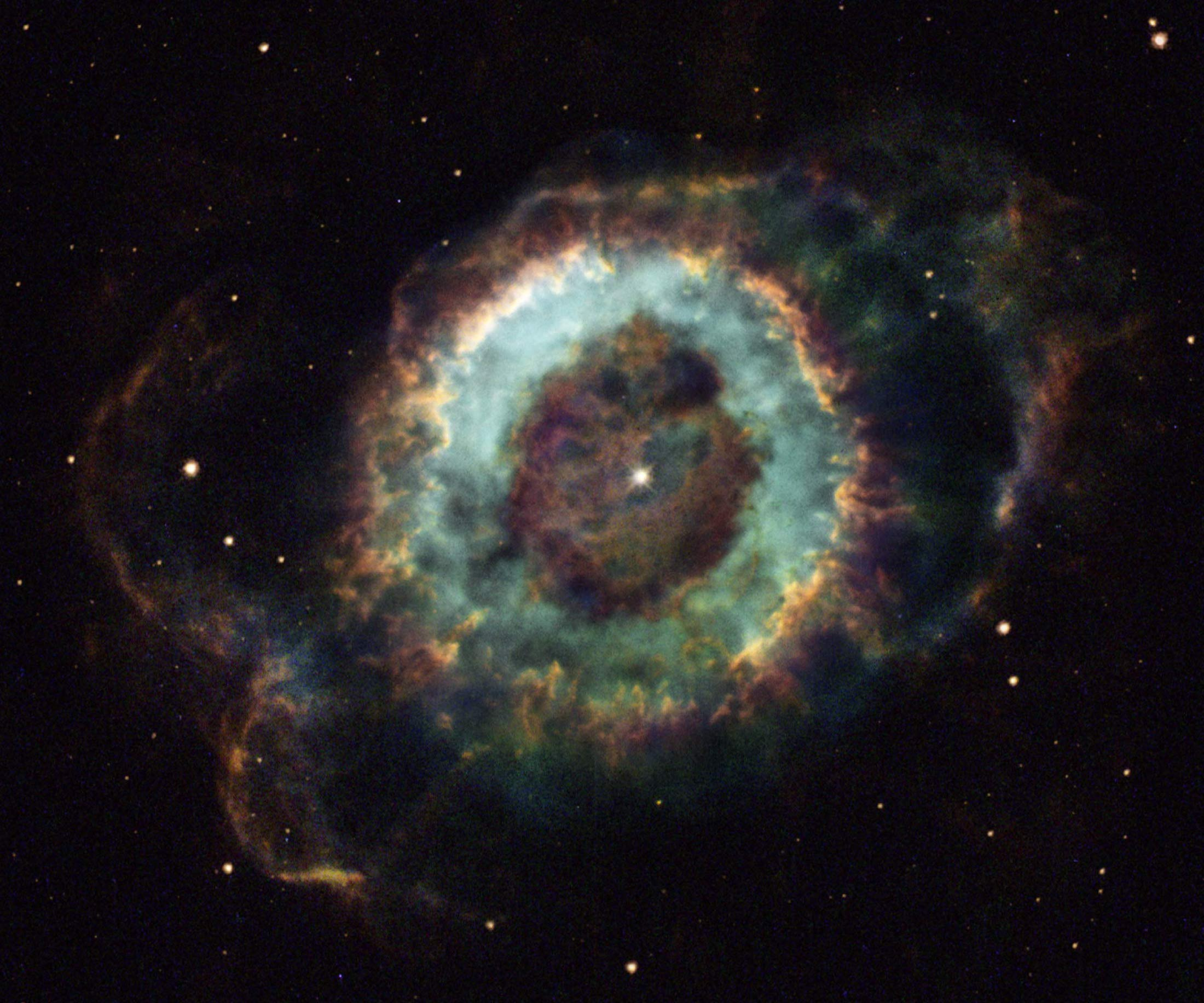

Observation data: J2000 epoch
- Right ascension: 17^{h} 29^{m} 20.457^{s}
- Declination: −23° 45′ 34.77″
- Distance: 2,000 - 5,000 ly
- Apparent magnitude (V): 12.00
- Apparent dimensions (V): 28″
- Constellation: Ophiuchus

Physical characteristics
- Radius: 0.136-0.34 ly
- Designations: NGC 6369, PK 002+05 1

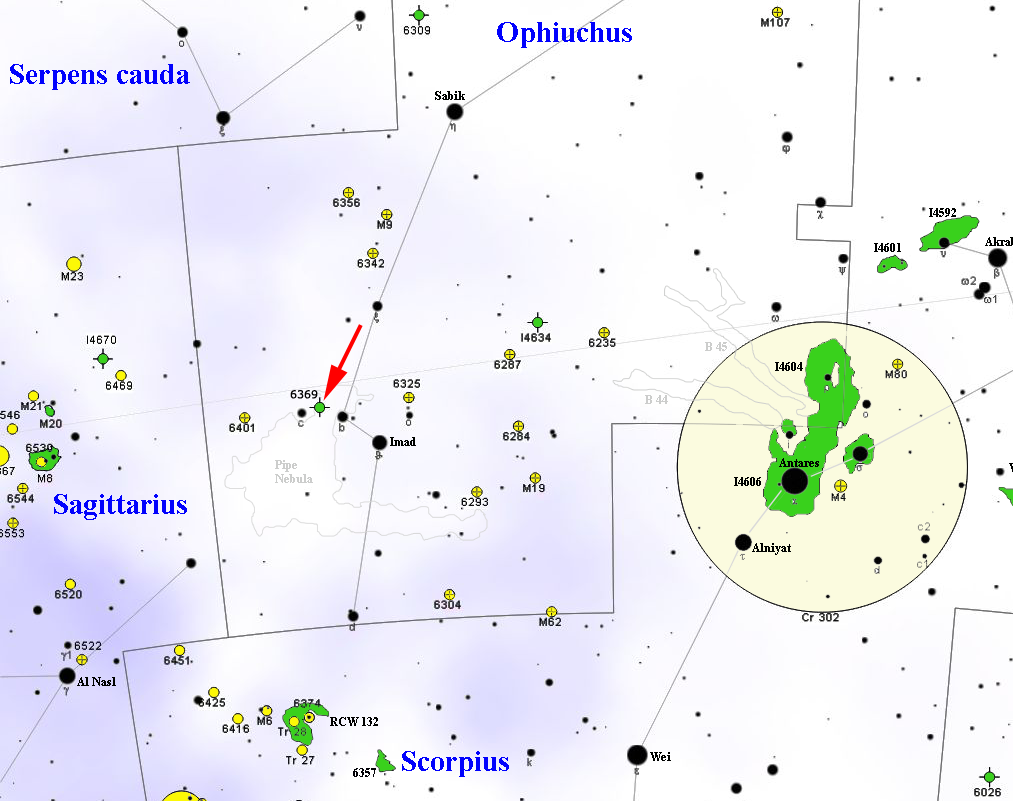
Map showing the location of NGC 6369

Little Ghost Nebula (also known as NGC 6369) is a planetary nebula in the constellation Ophiuchus. It was discovered by William Herschel in 1784.

Round and planet-shaped, the nebula is also relatively faint. The high-energy radiation from the central white dwarf causes the surrounding nebula to emit light. The nebula's main ring structure is about a light-year across and the glow from ionized oxygen, hydrogen, and nitrogen atoms is colored blue, green, and red, respectively.

The Little Ghost Nebula should not be confused with the Ghost Nebula (Sh2-136) or the Ghost Head Nebula (NGC 2080).

The central star of the planetary nebula has a spectral type of [WO3], indicating a spectrum similar to that of an oxygen-rich Wolf–Rayet star. Analysis of Gaia data suggests that it may be a binary system. The central star was monitored by the Kepler space telescope, but it was not found to be variable.

On 15 June 2011 it was occulted by the Moon during a total lunar eclipse (the June 2011 lunar eclipse) over Northeast Africa, Arabia, South Asia and the northern Indian Ocean.

== See also ==
- List of planetary nebulae
- List of NGC objects (6001-7000)
