= Iris Nebula =

Reflection nebula in the constellation Cepheus

Reflection nebula
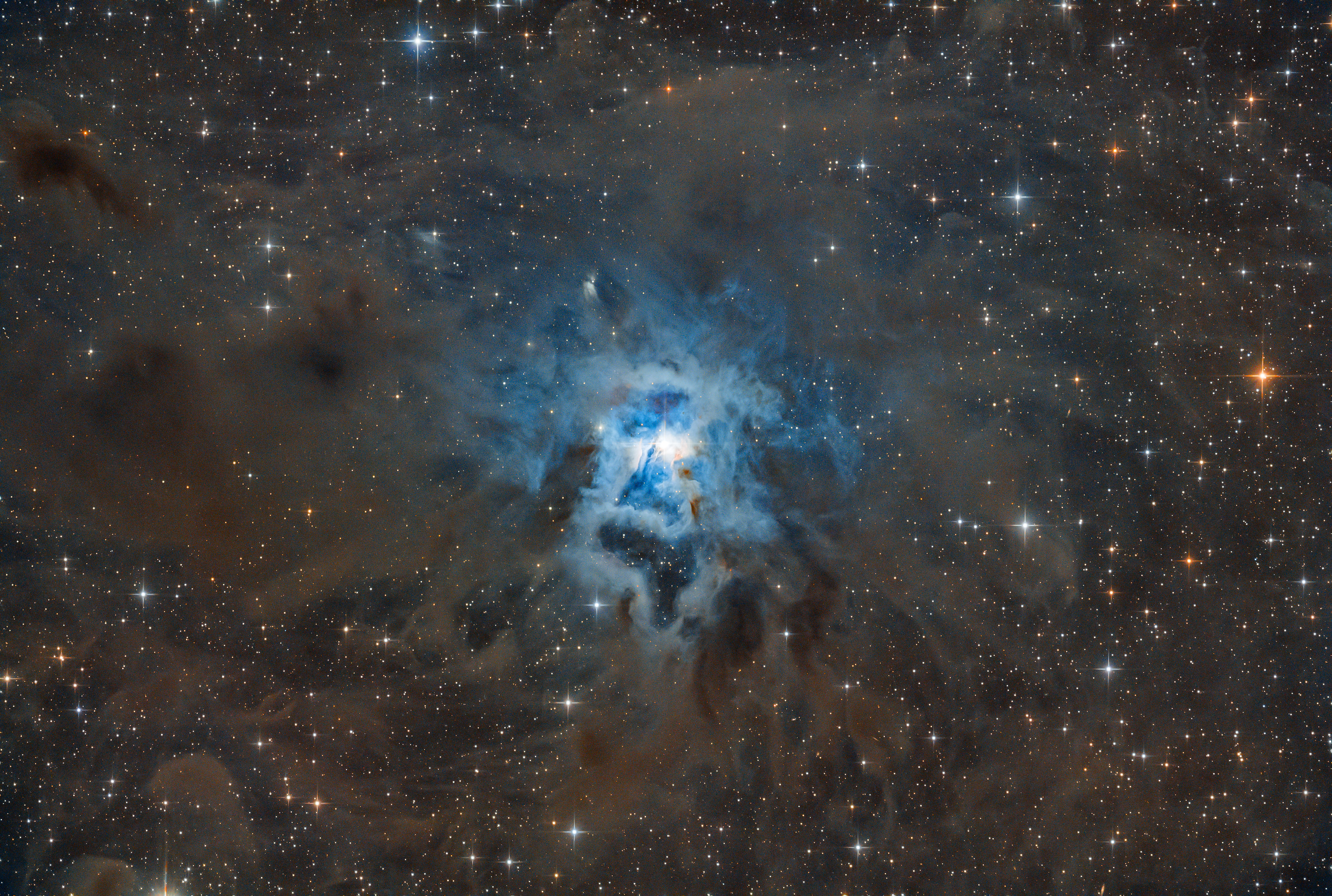
- Iris Nebula (NGC 7023 and LBN 487)

Observation data: J2000.0 epoch
- Right ascension: 21^{h} 01^{m} 35.60^{s}
- Declination: +68° 10′ 10.0″
- Distance: 1,300 ly
- Apparent magnitude (V): 6.8
- Apparent dimensions (V): 18′ × 18′
- Constellation: Cepheus

Physical characteristics
- Radius: 3 ly
- Designations: NGC 7023 and LBN 487, Caldwell 4, Cr 429

The Iris Nebula (also known as NGC 7023 or Caldwell 4) is a bright reflection nebula located about 1,300 light years from Earth in the constellation of Cepheus. The nebula is illuminated by a magnitude +7.4 star designated HD 200775. It is six light-years across. The nebula was discovered in 1794 by Sir William Herschel, an astronomer, where it was then added to the New General Catalogue (NGC).

The nebula is a member of the Cepheus Flare. It is located near the Mira-type variable star T Cephei, and near the bright magnitude +3.23 variable star Beta Cephei (Alfirk). The designation NGC 7023 refers to the open cluster within the larger reflection nebula designated LBN 487.

== Characteristics ==
The Iris nebula has a complex structure of clouds and filamentary structures. The distribution of these clouds is highly inhomogeneous containing several dense irradiated structures. Several photodissociation regions (PDRs) and dissociation fronts (FDs) have been observed bordering the cavity as bridge illuminated ridges towards the northwest, southwest and eastern directions. These regions are driven by soft radiation fields with effective temperatures of 18,000 Kelvin and G0 of ~2.6 ×10^3. These clouds have maximum densities from 10^{4}/cm^{3} to 10^{6}/cm^{3}. Inside the clouds, these densities decreases. The outflows from the binary stars near the center of the Iris nebula has carved out a biconical cavity and triggered the formation of a few photodissociation regions (PDR 1 and PDR 2).

In general, every filament of H2 has a corresponding extended red emission (ERE). These ERE filaments are generally 10% wider. The ERE filaments are edited in a two step process. The first step requires a photon with the energy of 10.5 eV to produce a ERE carrier. These carriers are probably PAHs because they match the three criteria: (1) having ionization or dissociation potential that is in excess of 10.5 eV, (2) exhibiting strong absorption in the optical or near-UV spectral region, and (3) is capable of efficient photoluminescence. This is possibly done through the process of photoionization and photodissociation of a suitable precursor. The second step requires a sufficient amount of pumping of the ERE which is carried by abundant optical and near-UV photons, energizing the ERE.

The Iris nebula contains polycyclic aromatic hydrocarbons (PAHs), large organic molecules that have their carbons arranged in honey-comb like shapes and their hydrogens attached to the edges.

=== Central stars ===
The blue light near the center of the image is produced by HD 200775, a binary star system that has a large role in shaping the nebula.

Located at the center of the Iris nebula is a binary system of intermediate-mass Herbig Ae/Be stars. The first is a +7.4 magnitude B2Ve-type stars. The second is a B5-type star. The nebula is solely illuminated by these stars and the photodissociation physics of the nebula is driven by this system. These stars also shape parts of the nebula such as the central cavity and some of the photodissociation regions.

=== Fullerenes ===
A spinning Buckminsterfullerene (C_{60}) which is found in the Iris nebula

Using the Infrared Spectrograph on the Spitzer Space Telescope, (Sellgren et al. 2007) was able to obtain the spectra of NGC 2023 and the Iris nebula. They discovered prominent emission lines at 7.04 ±0.05 μm that clearly show the presence of carbon fullerenes (C60) making it the first firm detection of neutral fullerenes in interstellar space and one of the largest molecules detected in space. The fullerens are located more towards the central star and in the central cavity unlike the polycyclic aromatic hydrocarbons (PAH) in the nebula.

It was generally believed that fullerenes formed due to the buildup of small carbonaceous compounds in the hot dense envelopes of evolved stars. However it was revealed that they seem to form efficiently in tenuous and cold environments such as interstellar clouds that are illuminated by strong ultraviolet (UV) fields of radiation. This means that there must be another pathway for the formation of fullerenes in these environments. Laboratory and theoretical studies show that a possible pathway for their formation involves PAHs being converted into graphene under UV radiation from massive stars such as HD 200775. Photochemical modeling of circumovalene (C60H20) by (Berné et al. 2015) was done to test the possibility that the PAHs can lead to the formation of fullerenes. These models predict that the formation of fullerenes in the nebula first involves the involves full dehydrogenation of circumovalene. It then fold into a floppy closed cage that shrinks with the loss of C2 units until it reaches the symmetric C_{60} molecule. Shrinkage of the cage seems to be the main kinetically limiting step of the entire process of fullerene formation meaning that molecules larger than circumovalene are unlikely to contribute significantly to the formation of fullerenes. Molecules containing fewer than 60 carbon atoms will often be destroyed not providing significant contributions. This makes molecules containing around 60-66 carbon atoms are most stable and likely to form fullerenes. Once they form, fullerenes can be stable on timescales greater than 10 million years at radiation fields below G_{0} = 10^{4}.

=== Young stellar objects ===
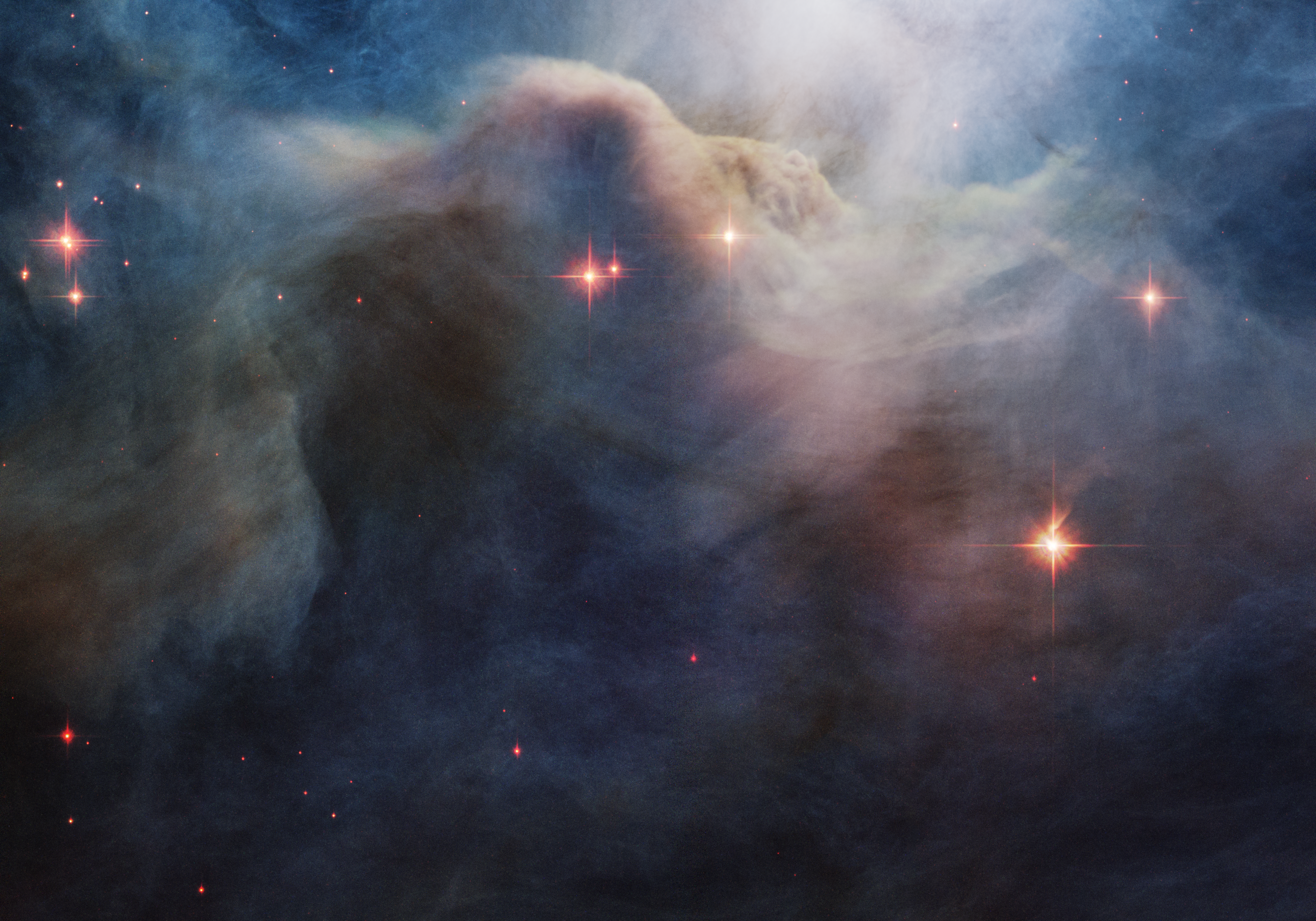
Close up section of the Iris nebula. The bright blue light on the top is HD 200775 which is out of frame. The smaller red dots are stars embedded in the nebula itself.

The Iris nebula contains several young stellar objects (YSOs). There are four candidate YSOs located within the northwestern region of the nebula. This nebula contains the most concentrated amount of YSOs in the Cepheus Flare. There are several scenarios for the formation of YSOs in the Iris nebula. The first is gravitational instabilities occurring on small scales forming dense shells and chains of YSOs along fronts of ionization. The sections scenario is gravitational collapsing occurring on larger scales forming regions of local star formation and young clusters of YSOs. The third scenario is gravitational instabilities that occur on dense thin, finger-like structures that occur in turbulence mediums irradiated by O-type stars. The fourth and final scenario is gravitational instabilities occurring from pre-existing condensations compressed by hot gas.

Observations of the Iris nebula show that there are no chains of YSOs and no observed dense thin, finger-like structures. This mean that the first and third scenarios of YSO formation can be excluded. Observations also show the existence of a probable Class 0 YSO that has been designated YSO 2101328+6811202. It is located far away from any fronts of ionization which gives support for the fourth scenario. Located further inside dust clouds are two embedded probable Class II YSOs that are designated YSO 2101264+6810385 and YSO 2101271+6810380. Their existence gives further support for the fourth scenario. Their existence also means that the temperature of gas and dust in the nebula were not too high for star formation to be prevented by thermal pressure.

=== Magnetic fields ===
The magnetic fields of the Iris nebula is curved and followed a clumped morphology. The strength of this magnetic field varies with the field strength of the starless core being 179 ±50 𝜇G, the strength of the protostellar core with a Class I source being 121 ±34 𝜇G and the strength of the protostellar core with a Class II source being 150 ±42 𝜇G. It appears that the magnetic fields have been reordered. This is possibly due to the interaction with the evolved high-velocity outflow of gas from the central star system.

== Notes ==
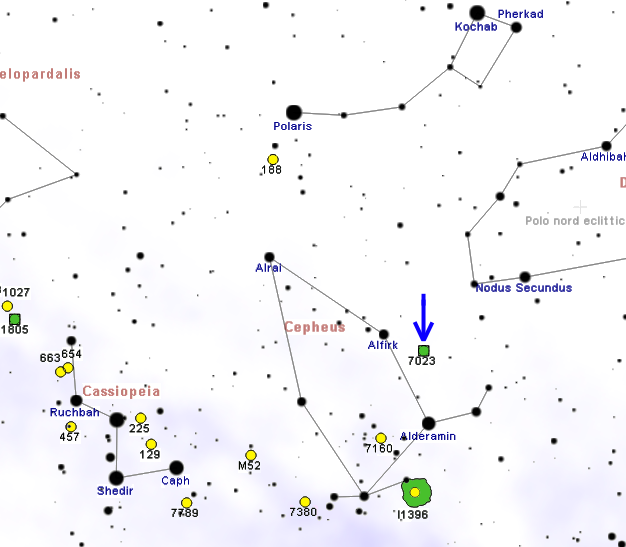
Map showing location of NGC 7023
