= VdB 24 =

Reflection nebula in Perseus

Nebula
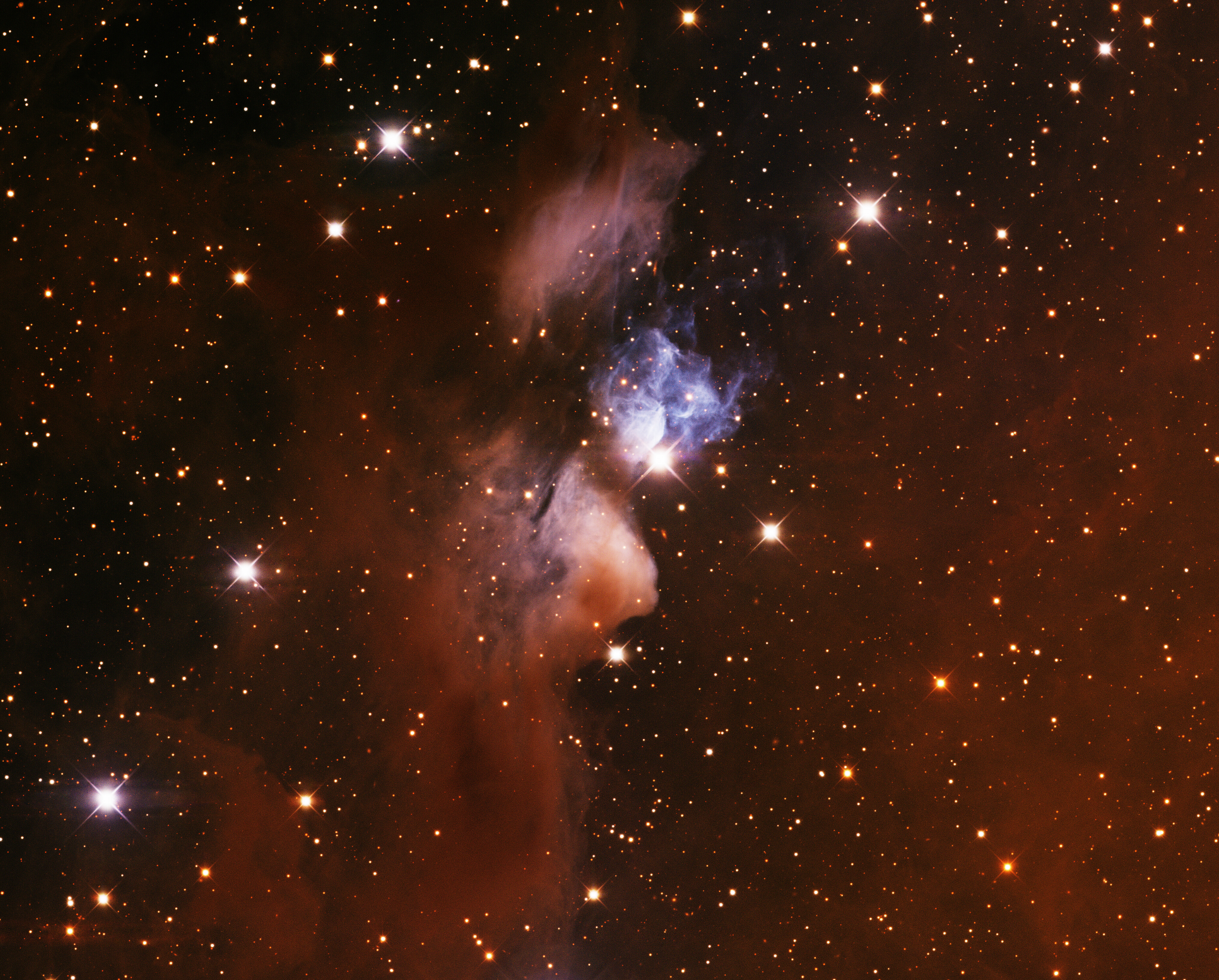
- Image of vdB 24 Nebula

Observation data: epoch
- Right ascension: 03^{h} 49^{m} 36.34^{s}
- Declination: +38° 58′ 55.5″
- Distance: 1,141 ly (350 pc)
- Constellation: Perseus
- Designations: vdB 24, LBN 1442

VdB 24 is a reflection nebula in the constellation of Perseus. It was catalogued as object 24 in Sidney van den Bergh's 1966 survey of reflection nebulae.

It is located about one degree southwest of the star Epsilon Persei, which is clearly visible to the naked eye. The cloud can be seen near a ninth magnitude star catalogued as XY Persei (A2II+B6), a Herbig Ae/Be star of spectral type A2 of high mass, which is also responsible for the illumination of the surrounding gases, which appear bluish in color. This star also has a companion at about 500 AU of separation. The nebula is part of the dark complex known as LDN 1449, located in the same galactic region as the California Nebula (Sh 2-220). The illuminated part of VdB 24 does not have a uniform appearance, but appears divided into three sections, one to the northwest, which appears directly in contact with other dark regions, one to the southwest, brighter and more elongated, and one to the south of the illuminating star, the brightest part.
