= VdB 158 =

Reflection Nebula in Andromeda

vdB 158
Nebula
- Image of the vdB 158

Observation data: epoch
- Right ascension: 23^{h} 37^{m} 51.60^{s}
- Declination: +48° 29′ 47.6″
- Distance: 1,435 ly (440 pc)
- Constellation: Andromeda
- Designations: vdB 158, LBN 534

VdB 158 is a faint reflection nebula located in the constellation of Andromeda, at the southern tip of the elongated molecular cloud known as LBN 534 or GAL 110–13. It is illuminated primarily by the hot B-type main-sequence star HD 222142 (B8V), whose reflected light gives the nebula its characteristic blue hue due to Rayleigh scattering. The nebula appears as a small, sharply bent structure embedded within the darker filament of GAL 110–13, often described as resembling a cosmic checkmark in wide-field images.

== Observation ==
VdB 158 lies approximately 2° north of the bright star Lambda Andromedae, near the border between Andromeda and Cassiopeia. Centered on HD 222142, though the associated cloud extends over about 1.5°–2° of sky in a northeast–southwest orientation. The region is part of the broader Lacerta OB1 star-forming association, several degrees to the west, and is best observed from the Northern Hemisphere during late autumn and winter under dark skies.

Due to its low surface brightness, VdB 158 is challenging for visual observation and requires long-exposure astrophotography to capture its details, often revealing the surrounding dark cloud and nearby objects such as the small planetary nebula PK 110–12.1 (discovered by Luboš Kohoutek in 1963).

== Structure ==
VdB 158 forms the brighter, reflective portion at the end of GAL 110–13, an isolated, cometary-shaped molecular cloud roughly 36 light-years (11 parsecs) across and elongated along a position angle pointing toward the O-type star 10 Lacertae (in Lac OB1b). The cloud's unusual 90-degree bend and overall morphology may result from interactions such as cloud–cloud collisions, stellar winds from nearby massive stars, or the aftermath of a supernova explosion within Lac OB1, which could have triggered star formation in the region. Additional illumination comes from two other B-type stars of spectral class B9V, HD 222046 and HD 222086, which share proper motion with HD 222142, suggesting they form a small physical group embedded in the cloud.

The cloud's magnetic field geometry, studied via polarimetric observations of background stars, shows a predominantly toroidal structure aligned with the cloud's long axis, consistent with compression by external radiation or shocks from 10 Lacertae at a projected distance of about 11 parsecs.
