= VdB 1 =

Small reflection nebula

Nebula
- Reflection nebula
- Image of Reflection nebula VdB 1 imaged by Adam Block

Observation data: J2000.0 epoch
- Right ascension: 0^{h} 11^{m}
- Declination: +57° 29′
- Distance: 1600 ly (491 pc)
- Constellation: Cassiopeia

VdB 1 is a small reflection nebula located in the constellation of Cassiopeia. It lies a few arcminutes to the south-east of the bright yellow-hued giant star Beta Cassiopeiae, officially named Caph. VdB 1 lies about 1,600 light-years away. Close to VdB 1 is the dark nebula LDN 1265. It is barely visible due to the brightness of Beta Cassiopeiae.

Its importance is linked to the presence of a pre-main sequence star known as V633 Cassiopeiae (LkHα 198), first identified in 1960. Its spectrum has been estimated as B3, B9 or A5 depending on the interpretation, its distance is 600 parsecs (almost 2000 light years) and its real luminosity is 160 L_{☉}, it also shows strong cataclysmic activity with flares. During the nineties a companion was discovered nested deep in the cloud, which seems to be the main responsible for most of the near-infrared emissions observed in the region, the real separation from the primary would be about 3300 AU and its luminosity would be about 100 L_{☉}.

Within the cloud, several jets are known, coinciding with as many HH objects: this is the case of HH 161, south-east of V633 Cas and linked to its hidden companion HH 162, associated with the nearby V376 Cas, and HH 164, whose source is the same V633 Cas. Three further jets are said to be connected to V633 Cas and its companion, catalogued as HH 800, HH 801 and HH 802, with a powerful jet visible even in optical light with a length of 2 parsecs (about 7 light years).
