= Cepheus Flare =

Molecular cloud complex in Cepheus constellation

Nebula
- Map of the Cepheus constellation where the Cepheus Flare is located.

Observation data
- Distance: 300-450 pc
- Constellation: Cepheus

The Cepheus Flare is an Orion-like complex of giant molecular clouds located around 300-450 parsecs from Earth in the constellation of Cepheus, centred around the star β Cephei. It is about 100 parsecs above the galactic plane of the Milky Way galaxy and has 2×10^{5} solar masses of neutral hydrogen.

Due to the abundance of star forming regions, dark nebulas, supernova remnants, young stellar objects, feedback structures and other objects, the Cepheus Flare complex is a unique laboratory to study the sequential formation of stars and similar structures.

== Contents ==
The Cepheus Flare contains many objects and a large number of dense dark nebulas, or dark clouds, and supernova remnants. 8 major cloud complexes and 208 dark clouds have been identified within the flare, major ones including LDN 1147, LDN 1148, LDN 1152, LDN 1155, LDN 1157, LBN 468, and Barnard 175. It also contains many regions of star formation, including Herbig–Haro (HH) objects, bright patches of nebulosity associated with new born stars. Star formation in the complexes produce various shock fronts, with may account for the wide range of velocities within the Cepheus Flare.

=== Structure ===
The Cepheus cloud has a complex structure with many molecular filaments, low-density cavities, dense areas of gas, expanding shells and other features. There is an infrared loop named GIRL G109+10 that triggers star formation.

=== Stellar contents ===
The flare has several low-mass star forming centres, but no high-mass star formation regions. As there are five A-type and B-type stars in the Cepheus R2 association, the complex probably had intermediate-mass star formation in the recent past. A list of some of the more notable stars on the Cepheus Flare can be found below.

| Name | Type | Description | Reference |
|---|---|---|---|
| HD 203024 | Herbig Ae/Be (B8.5V) | A star that is, in both characteristics and radial velocity, similar to BD +68°1118 | |
| HD 203854 | Chemically peculiar? | A possible peculiar star with high velocity. | |
| BD +67°1314 | B8V | A star located at the edge of L1177, a dark cloud, though it is not associated with the cloud based on velocity measurements. | |
| BD +68°1118 | Herbig Ae/Be (B8.5V) | Exhibits Hα emission. It is surrounded by a dusty circumstellar disk. | |

Other less notable stars in the Cepheus Flare complex include SAO 19953, HD 212826, HD 216486, BD +69°1231, CV Cepheus and BO Cepheus. There have been 98 Young Stellar Objects (YSO) canadites identified. Spatially linked to the Cepheus Flare complex is ASCC 127, a young moving group with around 3,179 identified members that seems to have carved out shells within the flare.
