= Barnard 175 =

Bok globule located in the Cepheus constellation

Nebula
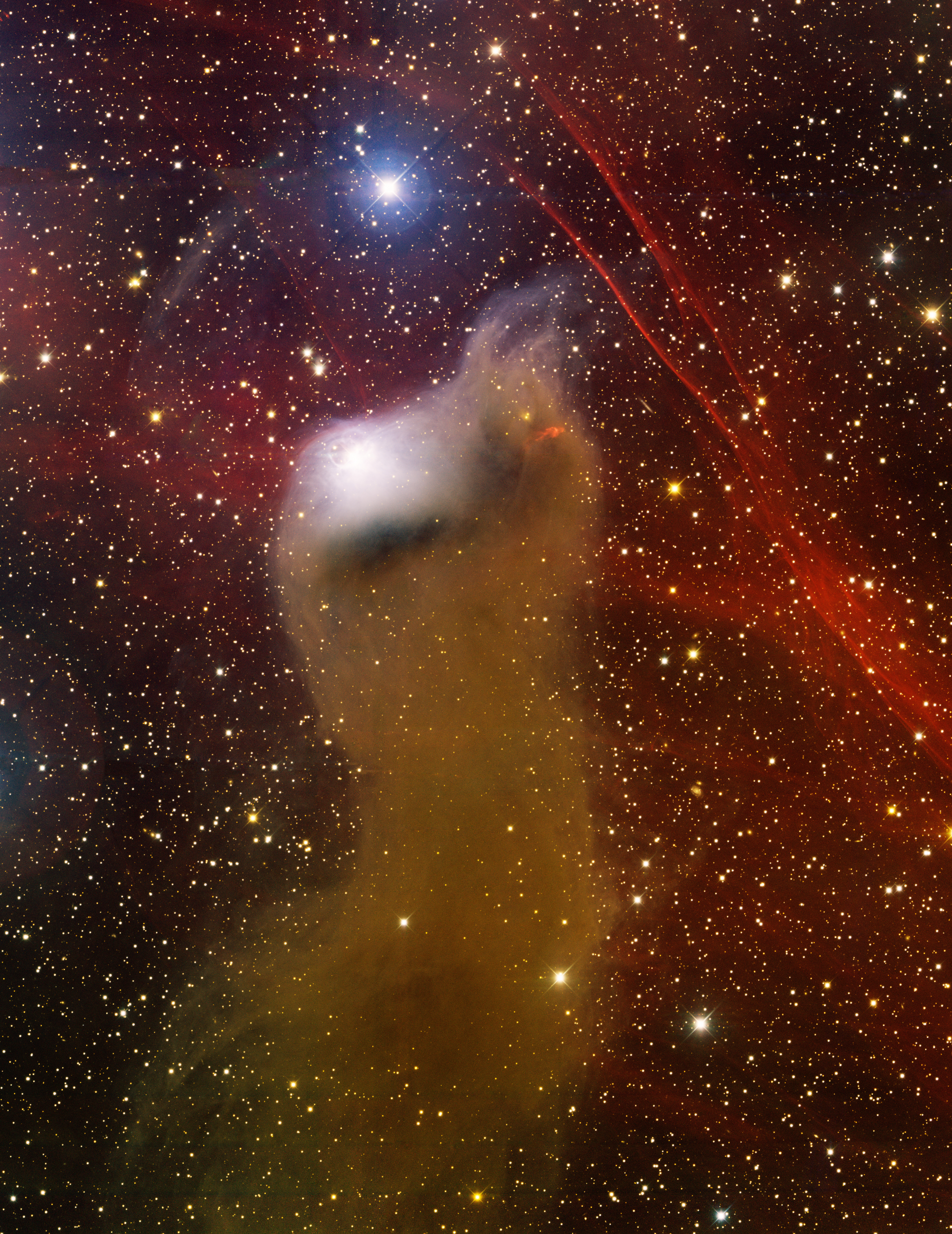
- Image of Barnard 175 obtained through the Mosaic camera on the Mayall 4-meter telescope at Kitt Peak National Observatory. In the top right is HH 450 and the thin red filements are supernova remnants

Observation data: J2000 epoch
- Right ascension: 22’ 13’ 33.3
- Declination: +70 15’ 25’’
- Distance: 400 pc
- Designations: B175

Barnard 175, also known as B175, is a cometary-shaped Bok globule located around 400 parsecs from Earth in the constellation of Cepheus. It is embedded within the Cepheus Flare shell, a giant complex of molecular clouds.

The southern edge of the object is illuminated by a B9.5V-type star known as BD+69 1231. This produces Ced 201, a prominent reflection nebula within Barnard 175.

== Contents ==
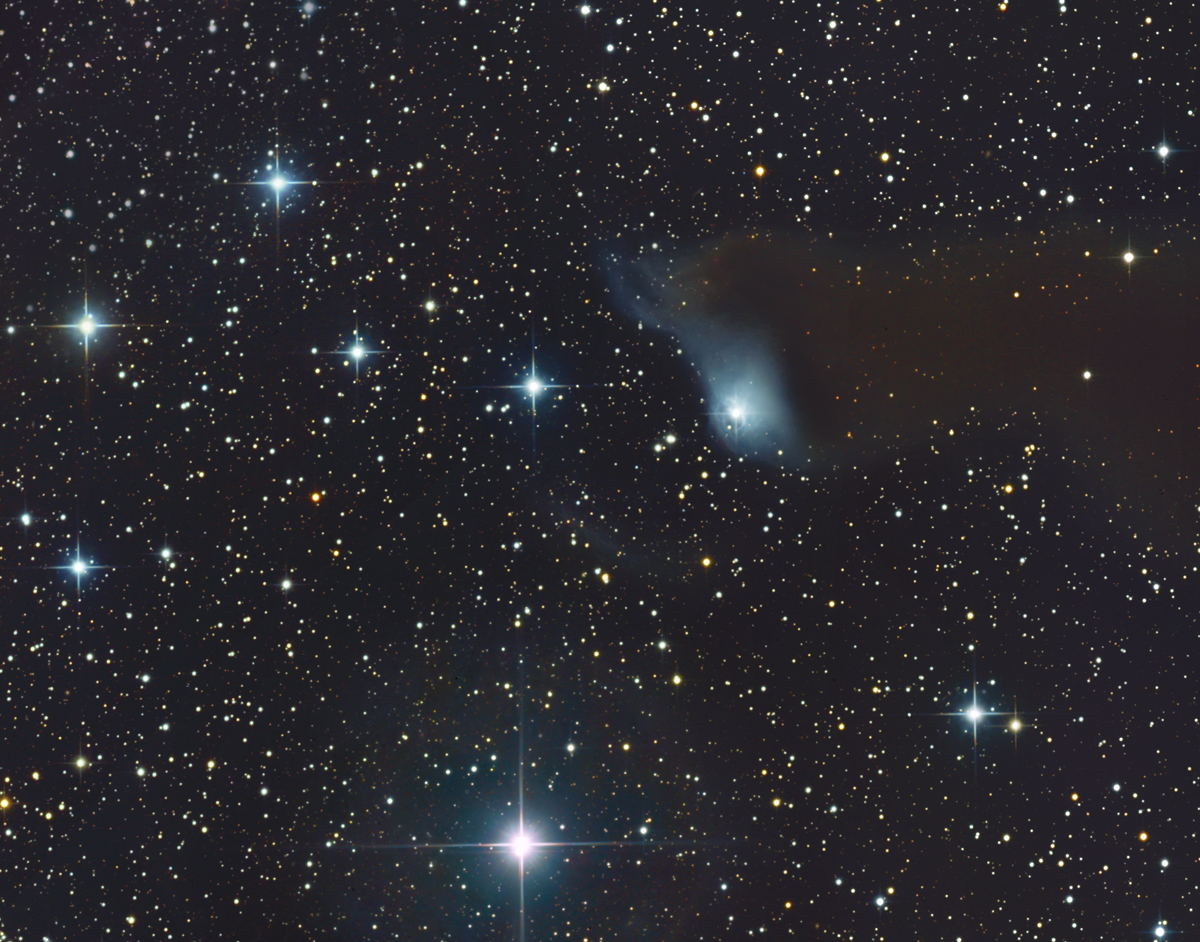
Image of Barnard 175 taken by an amateur astrophotographer.

The only known Herbig-Haro object (HH) located in Barnard 175 is HH 450 located in Ced 201. HH 450X was initially classified as a knot but was later reclassified as a background galaxy. IRAS source IRAS 22129+7000 is also located within Barnard 175.

It also contains the supernova remnant (SN) named SN G110.3+11.3. It is filamentous, with two red streaks named filament A and filament B. This remnant will likely begin a frontal collision with the outflows of HH 450. The remnant is traveling at a speed of around 300 km/s, with the outflows traveling at a speed of around 100 km/s. This means that they will collide in about 1000 years from now. When they do collide, a fast radiative shock will wrap around them, leading to indentations in the remnant due to its lower density. However the remnant will eventually make its away towards Barnard 175. Numerical simulations show that this will drastically alter the appearance and structure of Barnard 175, possibly triggering star formation.
