= NGC 2170 =

Reflection nebula in the constellation Monoceros

Reflection nebula
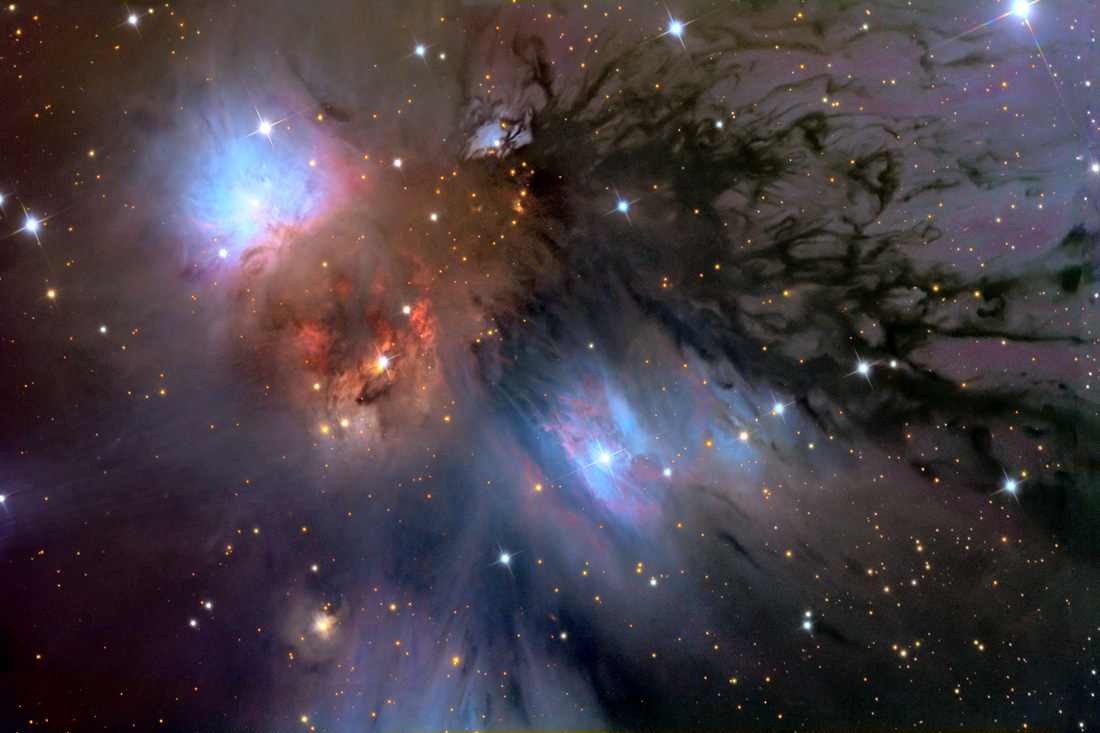
- Taken from the Mount Lemmon Observatory

Observation data: J2000 epoch
- Right ascension: 06^{h} 07^{m} 31.3^{s}
- Declination: −06° 23′ 53″
- Apparent dimensions (V): 2.0' x 2.0'
- Constellation: Monoceros
- Designations: Angel Nebula

NGC 2170, also known as the Angel Nebula, is a reflection nebula in the constellation Monoceros. It was discovered on October 16, 1784 by William Herschel.
