= Ghost Nebula =

Nebula in the constellation Cepheus

Reflection nebula
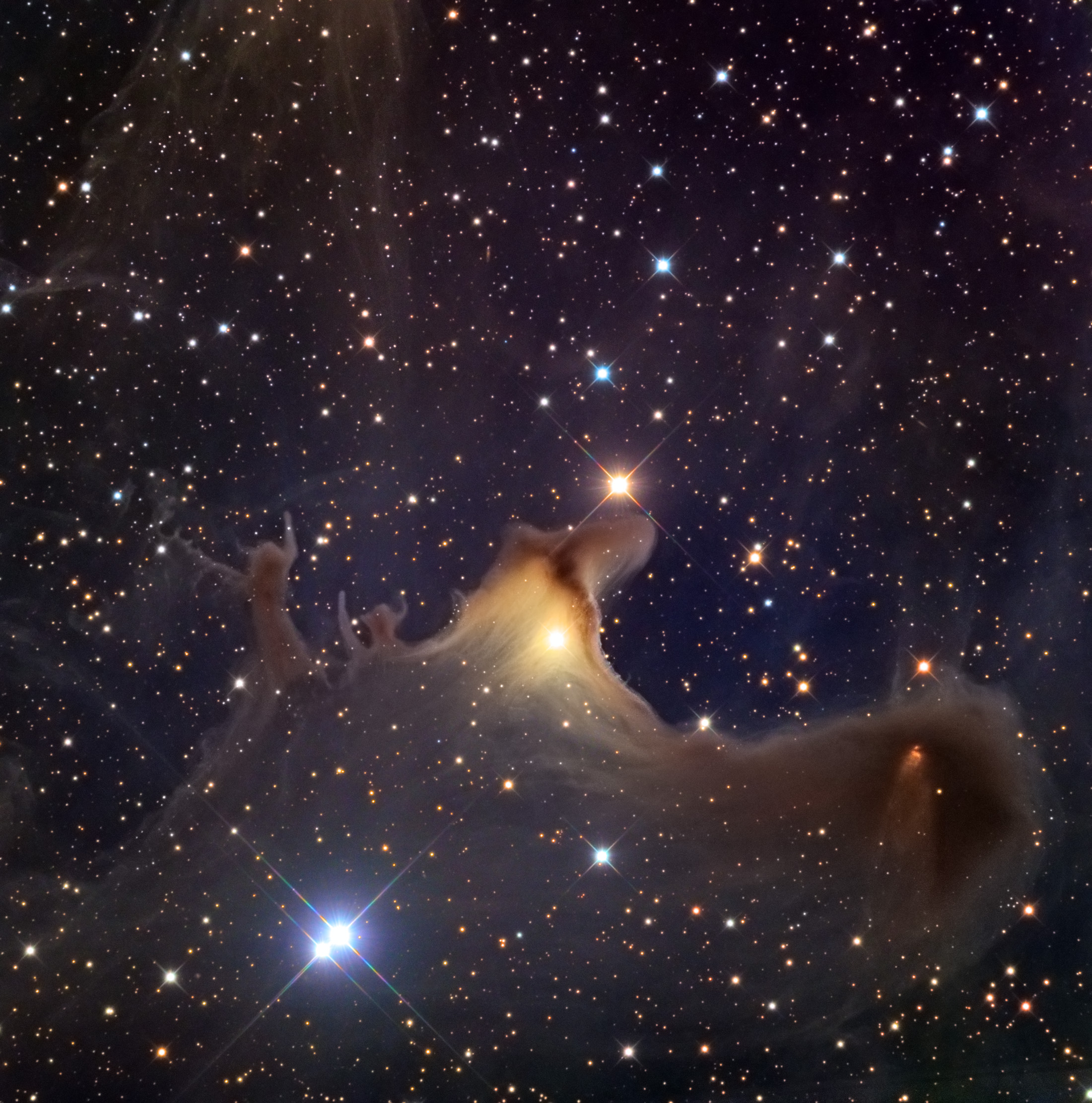
- Ghost Nebula by the Mount Lemmon SkyCenter (Credits: Adam Block, Mount Lemmon SkyCenter, University of Arizona)

Observation data: J2000 epoch
- Right ascension: 21^{h} 16^{m} 26^{s}
- Declination: +68° 15.6′
- Distance: 1,470 ly
- Constellation: Cepheus
- Designations: VdB 141, Sh 2-136

The Ghost Nebula (designated Sh 2-136, VdB 141) is a reflection nebula located in the constellation Cepheus.

It lies near the cluster NGC 7023. Looking at the adjacent image, the nebula's name is easily understood. The Ghost Nebula is referred to as a globule (catalogued CB230) and over 2 light-years across. There are several stars embedded, whose reflected light make the nebula appear a yellowish-brown colour.
