= List of planetary nebulae =

Planetary nebulae are a type of emission nebula created from the ejected gas of dying red giant stars.

The following is an incomplete list of known planetary nebulae.

== List ==
Image	Name	Messier Catalogue (Note: Table entries are sourced from the individual articles, where available, for each nebula. Please see the linked article on the nebula for references.)	NGC	Other designation	Date discovered	Distance (kly) (Note: Many distances are estimates (denoted by the approx. suffix), as true distances are difficult to infer for planetary nebulae. Please see main article, Planetary nebulae, for more details on distance estimates.)	Apparent magnitude (visual)	Constellation	Radius(ly)
	Glowing Eye Nebula or Dandelion Puffball Nebula		NGC 6751		1863	6.5	11.9	Aquila	0.4
	Turtle Nebula		NGC 6210		1825	4.7	9.3	Hercules	0.5
	Bow-Tie Nebula		NGC 40	Caldwell 2	1788	3.5	11.4	Cepheus	0.3
	Ghost of Jupiter		NGC 3242		1785	4.8	8.6	Hydra	0.91
	Blinking Planetary		NGC 6826	Caldwell 15	1793	2.0	8.8	Cygnus	0.22 x 0.20
	Dumbbell Nebula	M27	NGC 6853		1764	1.36 ^{+0.16}_{−0.21}	7.5	Vulpecula	1.44
	Ring Nebula	M57	NGC 6720		1779	2.3 ^{+1.5}_{−0.7}	9	Lyra	1.3
	Eskimo Nebula or Clown Face Nebula		NGC 2392		1787	2.9 (approx.)	10.1	Gemini	0.34
	Cat's Eye Nebula		NGC 6543		1786	3.3 ± 0.9	9.8B	Draco	0.2 (core), 1.75 (halo)
	Little Ghost Nebula		NGC 6369		1800 (prior to)	2 ± 3	9.9	Ophiuchus	0.136 – 0.34
	Medusa Nebula			Abell 21	1955	1.0 (approx.)	15.99	Gemini	4.0
	Jewel Bug Nebula		NGC 7027		1878	3.0 (approx.)	10	Cygnus	0.1 x 0.05
	Helix Nebula		NGC 7293		1824	0.68 ^{+0.15}_{−0.08}	7.6	Aquarius	2.87
	Little Dumbbell Nebula	M76	NGC 650, NGC 651		1780	3.4 (approx.)	10.1	Perseus	0.617
	Owl Nebula	M97	NGC 3587		1781	2.6 (approx.)	9.9	Ursa Major	0.91
	Twin Jet Nebula or Wings of a Butterfly Nebula			M2-9	1947	2.1	14.7	Ophiuchus	0.7
	Circlering Nebula (unofficial name)		NGC 7026		1873	5.6	10.0	Cygnus	0.5
	Butterfly Nebula		NGC 2346		1802	3.9 (approx.)	11.9	Monoceros	2
	Green Ball Nebula (unofficial name)			Abell 39	1955	6.8 (approx.)	13.7	Hercules	1.4
	Jones-Emberson 1 / Headphone Nebula			PK 164+31.1	1939	1.6 (approx.)	14.0	Lynx	1.5
	Lemon Slice Nebula			IC 3568	1918	4.5 (approx.)	12	Camelopardalis	0.2
	Soap Bubble Nebula			PN G75.5 1.7	2008	4 (approx.)		Cygnus	2.5
				IC 289	1888	5.2 (approx.)	13.2	Cassiopeia	0.35 – 0.55
				IC 2149	1906	3.6	10.6	Auriga	0.09
	White-Eyed Pea Nebula			IC 4593	1907	12	10.84	Hercules	0.075
				IC 4997	1896	8	11	Sagitta	0.092
	Skull Nebula		NGC 246		1785	1.6	8	Cetus	2-3
			NGC 6058		1787	11.41	13	Hercules	1
	Oyster Nebula		NGC 1501		1787	4.2	13	Camelopardalis	0.5
			NGC 1514		1790	2.2	9.4	Taurus	0.65, inner shell. 0.9, halo.
			NGC 7048	PK 088-01.1	1878	5.2 (approx.)	12.1	Cygnus	
			NGC 2022		1785	7 (approx.)	12.8	Orion	
			NGC 2371		1785	4.3	13	Gemini	
	Blue Racquetball / Turquoise Orb		NGC 6572		1825	2.5	8.1	Ophiuchus	
			NGC 6781		1788	2.5	11.4	Aquila	
			NGC 6790		1882	11	10.5	Aquila	
			NGC 6881		1881	5.2 ± 1.6	13.8	Cygnus	
			NGC 6884		1883	6.5	10.9	Cygnus	
			NGC 6891		1884	7.2	10.5	Delphinus	
			NGC 6886		1884	15.0 + 3.3	11.8	Sagitta	
			NGC 6742	Abell 50	1788	16.7	16.5	Draco	
			NGC 6894	PK 069-02.1	1784	4.2	12.3	Cygnus	
	Blue Flash Nebula		NGC 6905		1784	7.5 (approx.)	10.9	Delphinus	
			NGC 6804		1791	12.5 (approx.)	11.2	Aquila	
	Fetus Nebula		NGC 7008		1787	2.7	12	Cygnus	
			NGC 7354		1787	5.5	12.9	Cepheus	
	Blue Snowball Nebula		NGC 7662		1784	5.9	8.6	Andromeda	
			NGC 6803		1882	12.5	11.1	Aquila	
				Abell 78	1966	5	13	Cygnus	
				Abell 31	1955	2	12.2	Cancer	
	Soccer Ball Nebula			Kronberger 61	2011	13	18.4	Cygnus	
				IC 1454	1891	13.7 (approx.)	14	Cepheus	
				Abell 12	1955	6.9	14	Orion	
				Hen 2-47	1951	6.6	10.21	Carina	
			NGC 5844		1837	9.45	12.7	Triangulum Australe	
	Southern Crab Nebula			Hen 2-104	1967	7	14.20	Centaurus	
			NGC 5979		1835	13 (approx.)	12.10	Triangulum Australe	
	Red Spider Nebula		NGC 6537		1888 (prior to)	3.9 (approx.)	11.9	Sagittarius	
			NGC 6565		1880	14	14	Sagittarius	
	Bug Nebula or Butterfly Nebula		NGC 6302	Caldwell 69	1888 (prior to)	3.4 ± 0.5	7.1B	Scorpius	
	Saturn Nebula		NGC 7009		1782	3.0 (approx.)	8.0	Aquarius	
	Eight-burst Nebula or Southern Ring Nebula		NGC 3132		1888 (prior to)	2.6 (approx.)	9.87	Vela	
			NGC 2438		1786	2.9 (approx.)	11.5	Puppis	
			NGC 2440		1790	3.6 (approx.)	9.3	Puppis	
	Spirograph Nebula			IC 418	1888–1894	1.3 (approx.)	9.6	Lepus	
				IC 1295	1867	4.7 (approx.)	12.7	Scutum	
				IC 2448	1898	11 (approx.)	11.10	Carina	
				IC 4663	1901	11 (approx.)		Scorpius	
	Spare Tyre Nebula			IC 5148	1894	3 (approx.)	16.5	Grus	
	Retina Nebula			IC 4406	1888–1907	2.0 (approx.)	10.9	Lupus	
	Stingray Nebula			Hen 3-1357	1989	18 (approx.)	10.75	Ara	
	Spiral Planetary Nebula		NGC 5189		1835	2.6 (approx.)	9.5	Musca	
				Mz 1	1922	3.4 ± 0.5	12.0	Norma	
	Ant Nebula			Mz 3	1922	8.0 (approx.)	13.8	Norma	
	Shapley 1			PLN 329+2.1	1936	4.9	12.6	Norma	
	Engraved Hourglass Nebula			MyCn 18	1996	8.0 (approx.)	13.0	Musca	
			NGC 3918	Blue Planetary	1834	4.9	8.5	Centaurus	
			NGC 6578		1882	5.5 (approx.)	13.5	Sagittarius	
	Fleming 1			G290.5+07.9; ESO 170-6	1888?	7.9	13.1	Centaurus	
	Southern Owl Nebula			PN K 1-22; ESO 378-1	1971	4.3	17.4	Hydra	
				IC 4191	1907	6.85	11.6	Musca	
				IC 4634	1893	7.5	11.3	Ophiuchus	
				IC 4637	1901	7.8	12.5	Scorpius	
				IC 4642	1901	2.18 (approx.)		Ara	
				IC 5217	1904	8.15 (approx.)	12.6	Lacerta	
				IC 1297	1894	16.00	10.7	Corona Australis	
	Robin's Egg Nebula		NGC 1360		1868	1.5 (approx.)	9.4	Fornax	
	Cleopatra's Eye		NGC 1535		1785	6.5 (approx.)	10.5	Eridanus	
			NGC 2452		1847	15	12.20	Puppis	
			NGC 2899		1835	6.5	11.8	Vela	
			NGC 2792		1835	10 ± 2	11.6	Vela	
			NGC 2818		1826	10.4	12.50	Pyxis	
			NGC 2867		1834	7.3	10	Carina	
			NGC 3211		1837	10.76	11.5	Carina	
			NGC 3195		1835	5.5 (approx.)	11.6	Chamaeleon	
			NGC 4361		1785	3 (approx.)	10.9	Corvus	
			NGC 5307		1836	10	11.2	Centaurus	
			NGC 5315		1883	7 (approx.)	9.8	Circinus	
			NGC 5882		1834	7.7	9.4	Lupus	
			NGC 6072		1837	3.1	14	Scorpius	
				M2-42	1947	30.8	13.9	Sagittarius	
			NGC 7094		1884	3.5	13.5	Pegasus	
				M4-18	1959	17.1	14	Camelopardalis	
				M1-63	1946	32		Scutum	
				Abell 48	1955	14.9	17	Aquila	
			NGC 6153		1883	4.4	10.9	Scorpius	
	Box Nebula		NGC 6309		1876	6.5	11.5	Ophiuchus	
			NGC 6326		1826	11	12.2	Ara	
			NGC 6563		1826	5.37 ± 0.06	11	Sagittarius	
			NGC 6629		1784	13.4	11.3	Sagittarius	
	Phantom Streak Nebula		NGC 6741		1882	7	11	Aquila	
			NGC 6842		1863	4.5	13.2	Cygnus	
	Little Gem Nebula		NGC 6818		1787	6	9.3	Sagittarius	
				Abell 36	1955	0.78	12.2 ± 2.1	Virgo	
	Diamond Ring Nebula			Abell 33	1955	2.7		Hydra	
				Abell 63	1955	8.81		Sagitta	
				Abell 70	1966	7.8–16		Aquila	
	Box Nebula		NGC 6445		1786	4.5	11.2	Sagittarius	
	Ear Nebula			IPHASX J2050137+465518	2005			Cygnus	
				Ou 5	2010	3.1 (approx.)		Cygnus	
				PuWe 1	1980	1.3	15.54	Lynx	
				SuWt 2	1967	6.5	11.52	Centaurus	
	Eye of Sauron Nebula			M 1-42	1946	10	14	Sagittarius	
				WeBo 1	1996	5 (approx.)		Cassiopeia	
				Jones 1	1941	2.7 (approx.)		Pegasus	
				HFG 1	1982	6.8 (approx.)		Cassiopeia	
				HFG 2	1983		17.5	Puppis	
				Ka LMC 1	2025	18 (approx.)		Dorado	
				Kohoutek 4-55	1964		16.5	Cygnus	
				CVMP 1	1974	6.5		Circinus	
				Pease 1	1928	33.6		Pegasus	
	Planetary Nebula in Bootes			Jacoby 1	1993			Boötes	
				LoTr 1	1980	5.87 (approx.)		Lepus	
				LoTr 4	1980	19.56		Centaurus	
				LoTr 5	1980	1.65 (approx.)	8.69	Coma Berenices	
				KjPn 8	1971	1.6 (approx.)		Cassiopeia	
				DdDm 1	1966	63.27 (approx.)		Hercules	
	Exposed Cranium Nebula			PMR-1	2013	5 (approx.)		Vela	
				ETHOS 1	2009	27.5 (approx.)		Lyra	
				Vy 1-2	1942	47.29 (approx.)		Hercules	
				Vy 2-3	1945	38.5 (approx.)		Andromeda	
	Methuselah Nebula			MWP 1	1993	1.64 (approx.)	13.16	Cygnus	
				JaFu 1	1997	23.8	23.12	Ophiuchus	
	Matryoshka Nebula			Hb 12	1921	46.47 (approx.)	11.49	Cassiopeia	
				Hb 5	1921	6.5 (approx.	10.78	Sagittarius	
				HuBi 1	1990	22.44		Serpens	
				Hu 1-2	1920	5.2 (approx.)	12.0 (approx.)	Cygnus	
				Hu 2-1	1992	7.66 (approx.)	11.6	Hercules	
				J 320	1911	19.57 (approx.)	12.9 (approx.)	Orion	
				J 900	1912	15.00 (approx.)	17.8	Gemini	
				Me 2-1	1942	21.73 (approx.)		Libra	
				TS 01	1999	58.70 (approx.)		Ursa Major	

== See also ==
- Lists of astronomical objects
- Lists of planets
