= NGC 2792 =

Planetary nebula in the constellation Vela

Nebula
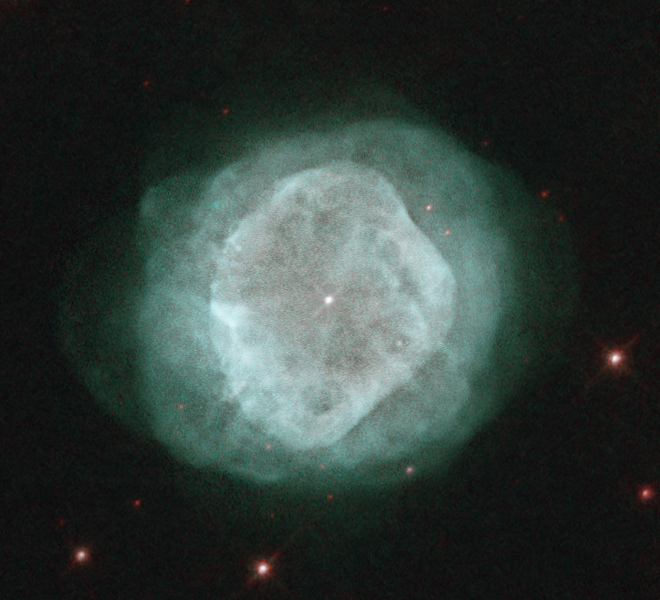

Observation data: J2000 epoch
- Right ascension: 09^{h} 12^{m} 26^{s}
- Declination: −42° 25′ 39″
- Constellation: Vela
- Designations: PK 265+4.1, ESO 314-PN6, AM 0910-421, CS = 13.8, HD 79384, IRAS 09105-4213, WEB 8618, PMN J0912-4225, 2MASS J09122664-4225397

NGC 2792 is a planetary nebula located in the constellation Vela. It was discovered by the British astronomer John Herschel in 1835 during his observations at the Cape of Good Hope.

== Observation ==
With an apparent magnitude of 11.6, NGC 2792 is not visible to the naked eye and requires a telescope with an aperture of at least 200 mm (8 inches) for observation.

== Characteristics ==
Two similar distance estimates are listed in the SIMBAD database: 3.086 ± 0.617 kiloparsecs (kpc), or approximately 10,100 light-years (ly), and approximately 3.05 kpc (about 9,950 ly).

The apparent angular size of the nebula is 0.350′ × 0.315′. Based on the distance estimate of 3.086 ± 0.617 kpc, this corresponds to a physical size of approximately 1.02 ± 0.20 light-years × 0.92 ± 0.18 light-years.

SIMBAD also lists two identical values for the radial velocity of the nebula: 14.0 ± 5.0 km/s. A more recent study published in 2023 reports a slightly different value of 12.7 ± 8.0 km/s.

== Age ==
The kinematic age of a planetary nebula can be estimated based on its expansion velocity. According to González-Santamaría and colleagues, NGC 2792 has an expansion velocity of approximately 20 km/s, which yields a kinematic age of about 3,500 years. A more recent study reports a slightly revised expansion velocity of 20.2 km/s.

González-Santamaría further estimates that approximately 50,860 years have passed since the central star departed the asymptotic giant branch (AGB) phase and the surrounding nebula reached 1% of the progenitor star’s original mass.

== Central star ==
The visual magnitude of the central star is 16.74, and its mass is estimated to be approximately 1.163 solar masses. The radius of the surrounding nebula is estimated to be 0.108 parsecs.

== See also ==
- List of planetary nebulae
- List of NGC objects (2001–3000)
- New General Catalogue
