= NGC 3918 =

Planetary nebula in the constellation Centaurus

Emission nebula
- Planetary nebula
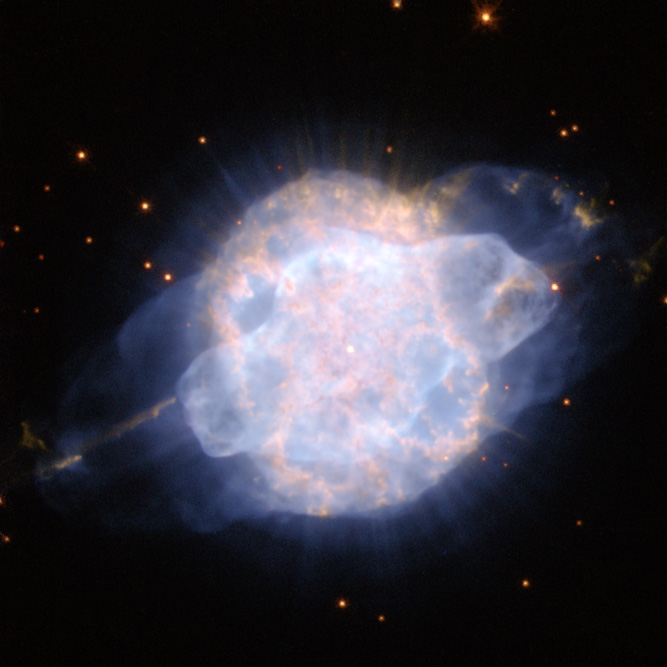
- Hubble Space Telescope image of NGC 3918. Credit: ESA/Hubble and NASA.

Observation data: J2000.0 epoch
- Right ascension: 11^{h} 50^{m} 17.7^{s}
- Declination: −57° 10′ 56.9″
- Distance: 4 900 ly
- Apparent magnitude (V): 8.5
- Apparent dimensions (V): 8 to 10 arcsec
- Constellation: Centaurus

Physical characteristics
- Radius: 0.095-0.12 ly
- Designations: He2-74 / Hen 2-74 / Sa2-81 / PK 294+4.1 / PN G294.6+04.7 / ESO 170-1

NGC 3918 is a bright planetary nebula in the constellation Centaurus, nicknamed the "Blue Planetary" or "The Southerner". It is the brightest of the far southern planetary nebulae. This nebula was discovered by Sir John Herschel in March 1834 and is easily visible through small telescopes. The round or even slightly oval diameter is telescopically between 8 and 10 arcsec, though deep images extends this to about 19 or 20 arcsec. More surprising is the beautiful rich blue colour that looks much like the coloured images of Neptune taken by Voyager 2 in 1989.

Spectroscopy reveals NGC 3918 is approaching us at 17±3.0 kilometres per second, while the nebulosity is expanding at around 24 kilometres per second. The central star is 14.6 visible light magnitude, and remains invisible to optical observers, as it is obscured by the sheer brightness of the surrounding nebula.

The distance is estimated at 1.5 kpc (4 900 light-years).

== See also ==
- List of NGC objects
- List of planetary nebulae
