= NGC 6742 =

Planetary nebula in the constellation Draco

Emission nebula
- Planetary nebula
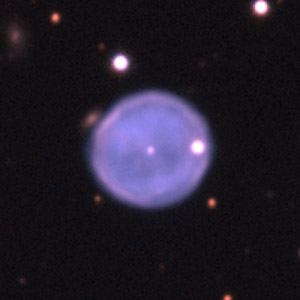
- NGC 6742, as photographed by the legacy survey

Observation data: J2000 epoch
- Right ascension: 18h 59m 20s
- Declination: +48° 27′ 55″
- Constellation: Draco

Physical characteristics
- Absolute magnitude (V): 13.4
- Designations: Abell 50

NGC 6742 (also known as Abell 50) is a planetary nebula in the constellation Draco. NGC 6742 was discovered by German-British astronomer William Herschel in 1788. Very few studies have been carried out on NGC 6742 and the identification of the central star of the nebula by the Kepler Space Telescope is uncertain.

== Morphology ==
Two distances are indicated in the SIMBAD astronomical database: 5,150 ± 1,030 kpc (~16,800 ly) and approximately 5,091 pc (~16,600 ly). Its apparent size is 0.553′. No data is available for its speed.

== Observation ==
NGC 6742 has a magnitude of 13.4, meaning that its surface brightness is high enough to be seen with a 25 cm diameter telescope. It appears as a round disk measuring 30"6.

== Gallery ==
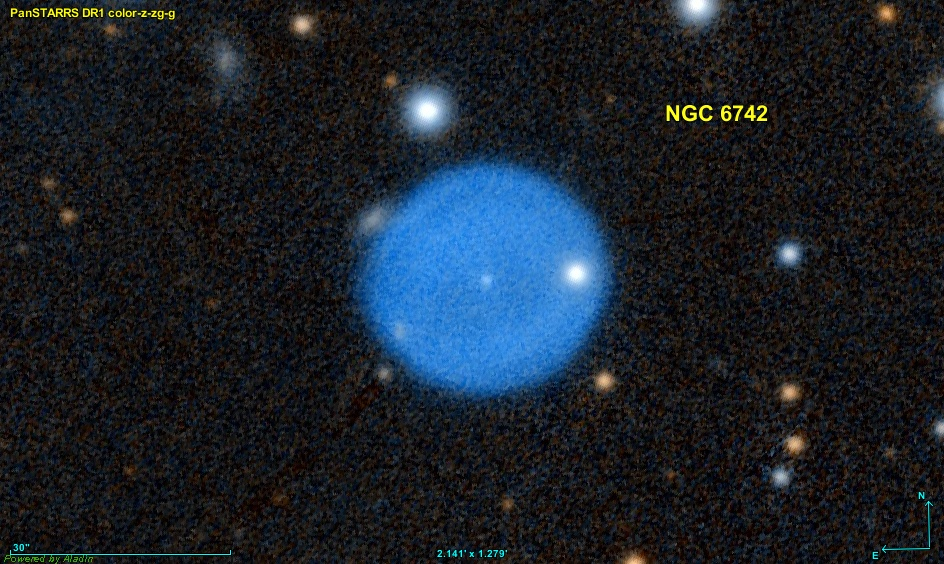

== See also ==
- Lists of nebulae
- List of planetary nebulae
- List of NGC objects (6001–7000)
