= NGC 6563 =

Planetary nebula in Sagittarius

Nebula

Observation data: J2000 epoch
- Right ascension: 18^{h} 12^{m} 02^{s}
- Declination: −33° 52′ 05″
- Apparent magnitude (V): 10
- Apparent dimensions (V): 0.7′
- Constellation: Sagittarius

NGC 6563, also known as the Southern Ring Nebula, is a planetary nebula in the constellation Sagittarius. NGC 6563 was discovered by Scottish astronomer James Dunlop in 1826. Renowned observer and author Stephen James O'Meara described it as a "hidden treasure".

== Morphology ==
Two fully compatible distances are indicated in the SIMBAD database: 1.665 ± 0.333 kpc (~5430 ly) and approximately 1646 pc (~5370 ly). Two identical speed values are also indicated on SIMBAD, −31.0 ± 5.0 km/s. The apparent size of the nebula is 0.8'3 or 0.79'4 (0.795 ± 0.005'), which, taking into account the distance calculations, equates to an actual size of 1, 26 ± 0.26 al.

The morphology of NGC 6563 corresponds to an expanding ellipsoidal shell with a ring, as well as two ear-like projections on either side of the ellipsoidal shell. The ellipsoidal shell and ring have a kinematic age of about 3,700 years, while the ears are older, 7500 to 8800 years old.

Observations show the expanding CO shell is pretty much continuously distributed around the minor axis waist and the nebula is tilted to the plane of the sky. The shell is also fragmented into a series of condensations.

== Central star ==
The visual magnitude of the central star is 17.49 and its mass is estimated at 2.932 solar masses. Its surface temperature reaches 123 k K and its luminosity is equal to 69 times that of the Sun. The radius of the nebula is estimated at 0.122 pc and its age is equal to 6,350 years.

== Gallery ==
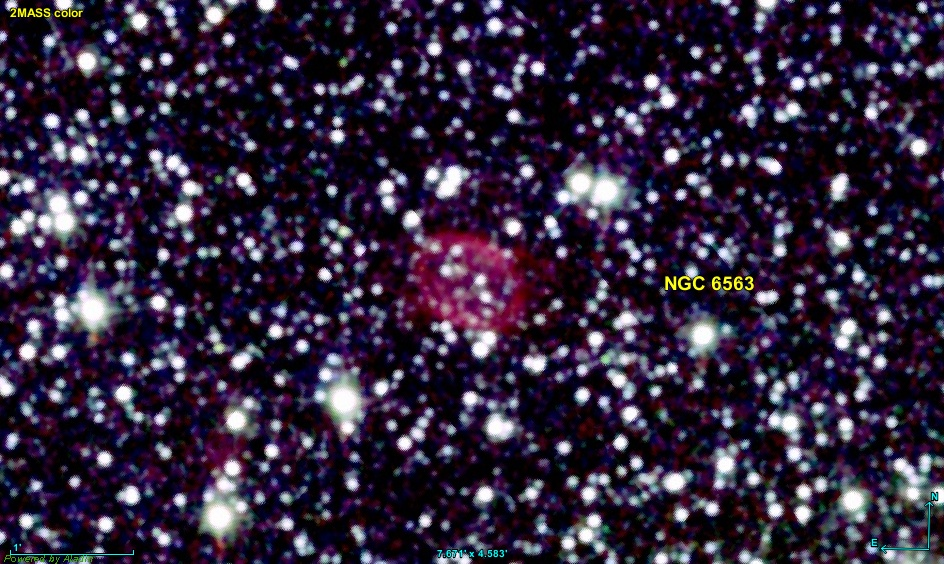
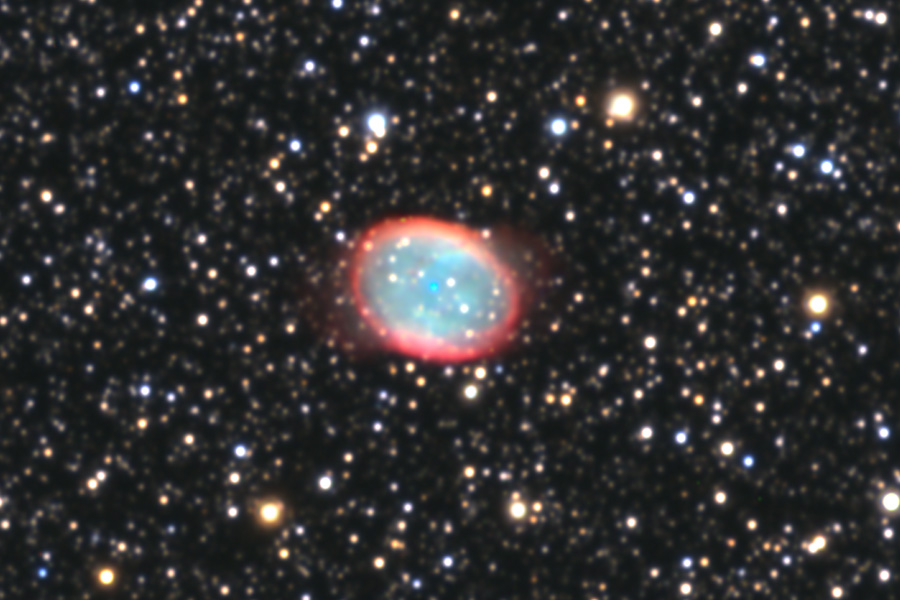

== See also ==
- List of planetary nebulae
- List of NGC objects (6001–7000)
