= Kronberger 61 =

Nebula in the constellation Cygnus

Emission nebula
- Planetary nebula
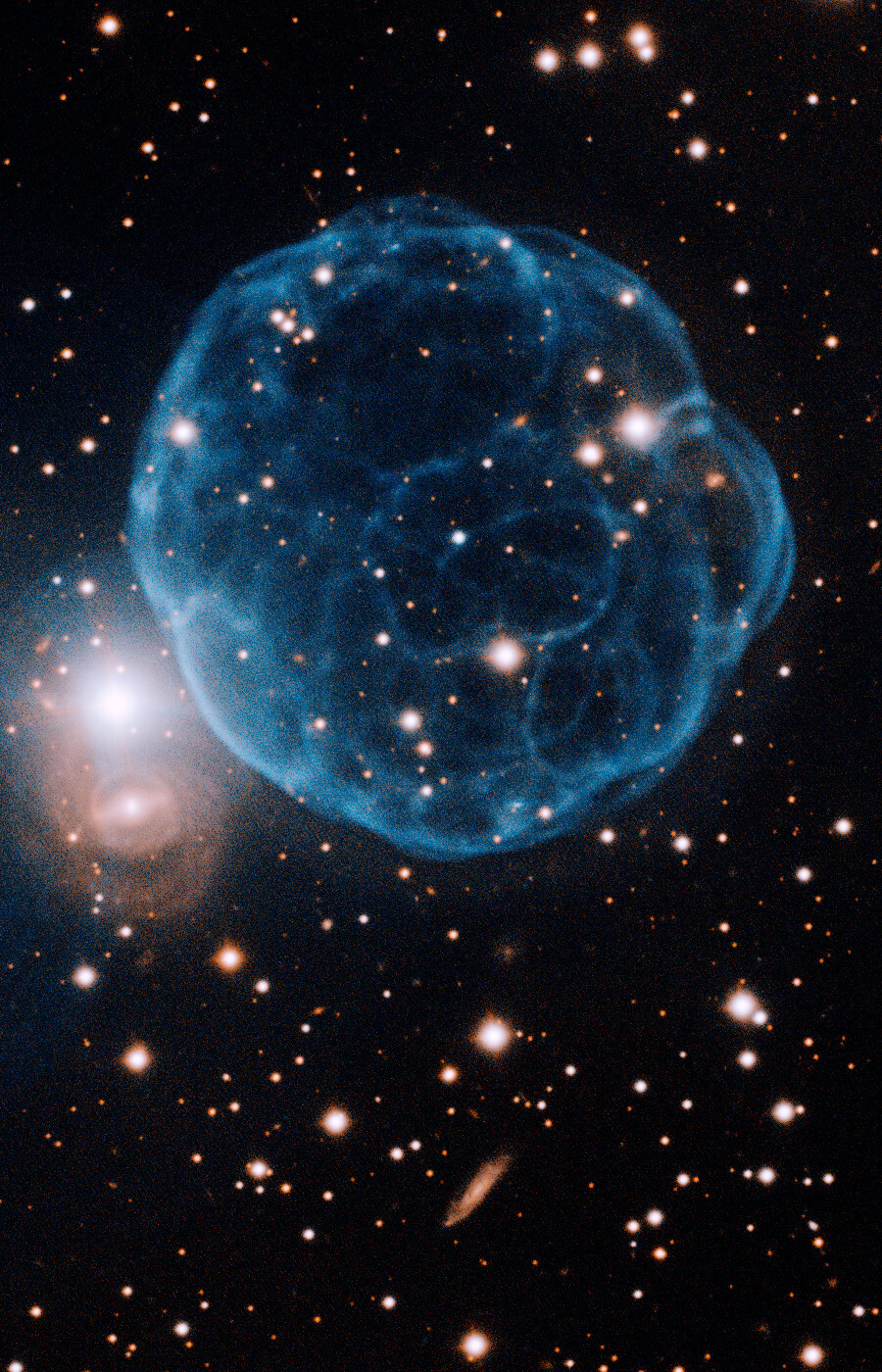
- Image of the Kronberger 61 nebula taken by the Gemini Observatory

Observation data: J2000 epoch
- Right ascension: 19^{h} 21^{m} 38.936^{s}
- Declination: +38° 18′ 57.2420″
- Apparent dimensions (V): 1' 30"
- Constellation: Lyra
- Designations: Kronberger 61, Soccer Ball Nebula

Kronberger 61, also known as the "soccer ball", is a planetary nebula discovered by an amateur astronomer in January, 2011, with the newer images having been taken by the Gemini Observatory. The nebula is named for Austrian Matthias Kronberger, who is a member of the amateur group Deep Sky Hunters. The object is estimated to lie 13,000 light-years away. They discovered the nebula while searching near the northern constellation of Cygnus. It is hoped that the discovery will help resolve a decades-old debate, regarding the role of stellar companions in the formation and structure of planetary nebulae.

The nebula is within a relatively small area, which is currently being monitored by NASA's Kepler planet finding mission and the light of the nebula is primarily due to the emissions from doubly ionized oxygen.

== See also ==
- IRAS 19475+3119, protoplanetary nebula of Cygnus
- List of largest nebulae
