= Kohoutek 4-55 =

Planetary nebula in the Cygnus constellation

Nebula
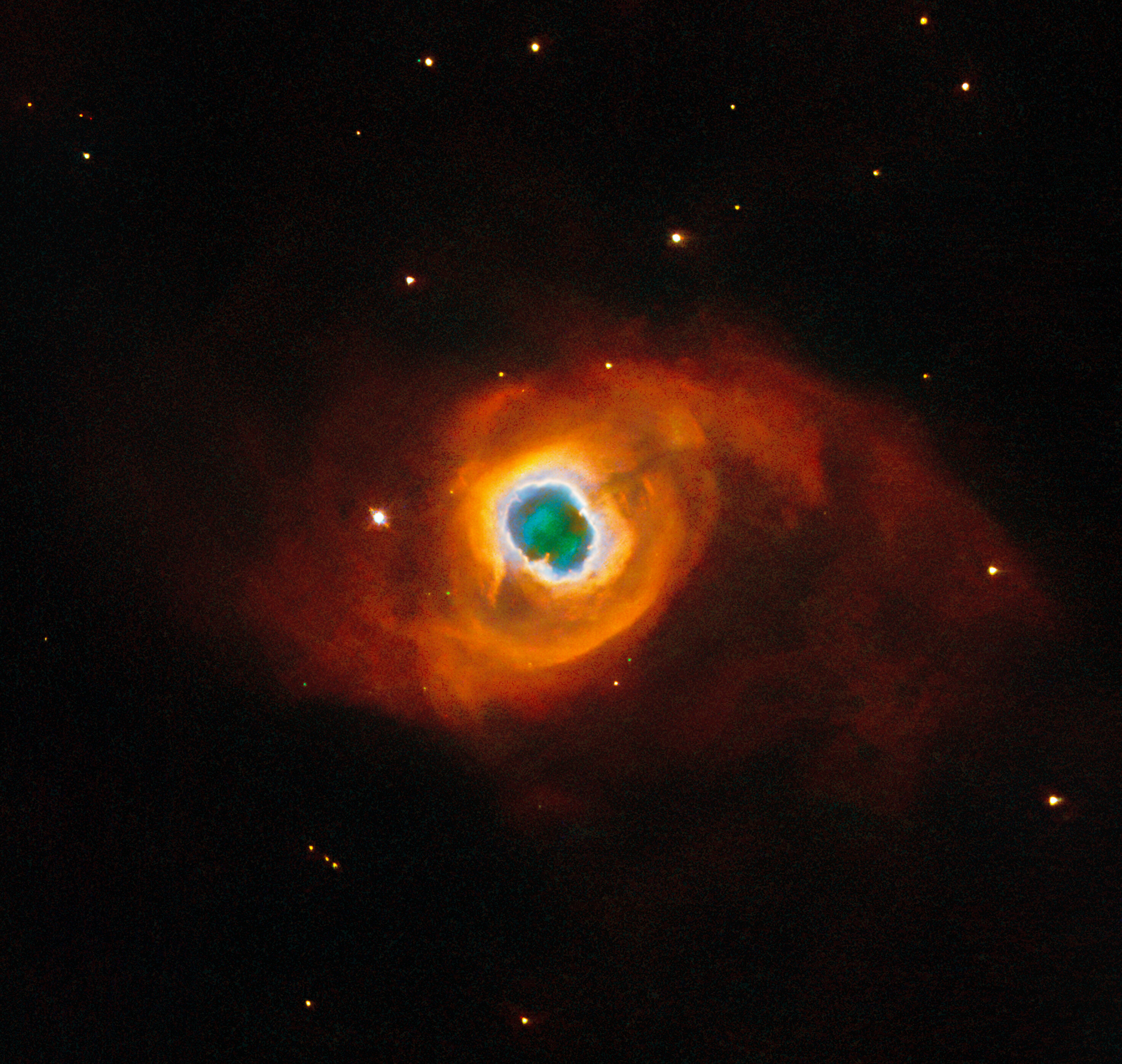
- Image of Kohoutek 4-55 by NASA’s Wide Field Planetary Camera 2

Observation data: J2000 epoch
- Right ascension: 20 45 10.02
- Declination: +44 39 14.6
- Distance: 4500 ly
- Constellation: Cygnus
- Designations: 37P 38, EM* UHA 15, GSC2 N033132112070, PK 084+01 1, PN G084.2+01.0, PN K 4-55, UWISH2 G084.20031+01.09069

Kohoutek 4-55, or simply K 4-55, is a planetary nebula located around 4500 light years away from Earth in the constellation of Cygnus. It was named after its discoverer Luboš Kohoutek, a Czech astronomer who had discovered many planetary nebula along with many minor planets.

It was formed by a red giant star at the end of its life expelling its outer layers into interstellar space. The ultraviolet radiation emitted from the remaining core of the star then ionizes the surrounding gas causing it to glow. This nebula is rare as it has a multi-shelled structure which is fairly uncommon in planetary nebula. The inner ring of Kohoutek 4-55 is bright and asymmetric. It is surrounded by a faint red halo of light that is emitted from ionized nitrogen gas.
