= Ear Nebula =

Planetary Nebulae in Constellation of Cygnus

IPHASX J205013.6+465515
Nebula
- Planetary Nebula
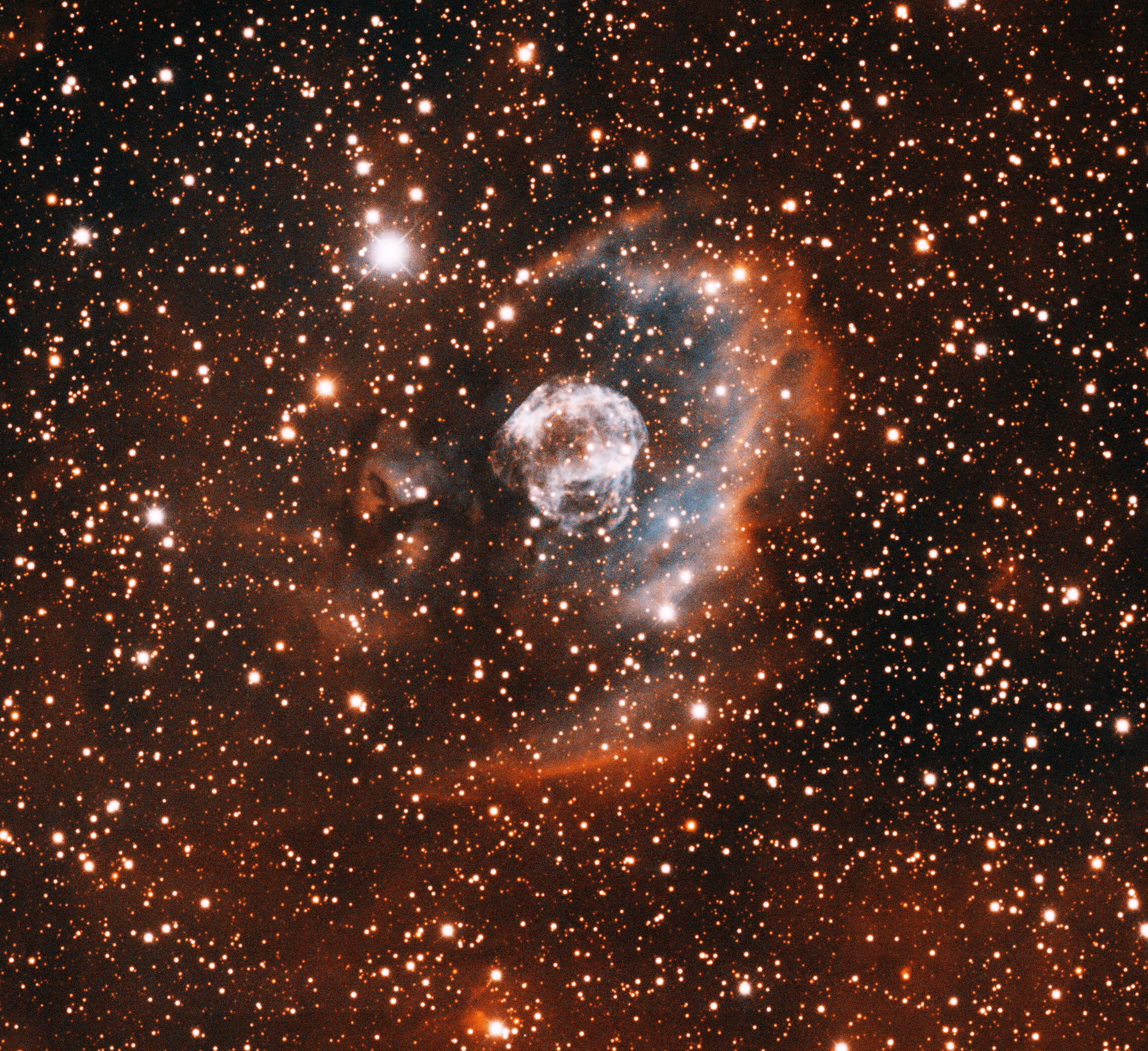
- Image of Ear Nebula

Observation data: epoch
- Right ascension: 20^{h} 50^{m} 13.00^{s}
- Declination: +46° 55′ 18.0″
- Constellation: Cygnus
- Designations: IPHASX J205013.6+465515, PN G086.5+01.8, Ear Nebula, Ra 10

IPHASX J205013.6+465515, informally known as the Ear Nebula, is a faint bipolar planetary nebula located in the constellation of Cygnus. It was discovered in 2005 during the INT Photometric Hα Survey (IPHAS) and is classified as a relatively evolved object with low surface brightness, making it challenging to observe without specialized equipment.

== Characteristics ==
It is surrounded by a faint, irregular shell, which may represent an asymptotic giant branch (AGB) remnant and the central star might be a white dwarf or an early multiple-shell structure. This shell suggests minimal distortion in the main nebula, classifying it as a WZO1-type planetary nebula-interstellar medium (PN-ISM) interaction candidate, where the central structure remains largely unaffected, possibly with a distant bow shock.
