= Jonckheere 320 =

Planetary nebula in the constellation Orion

J320
Emission nebula
- Planetary nebula
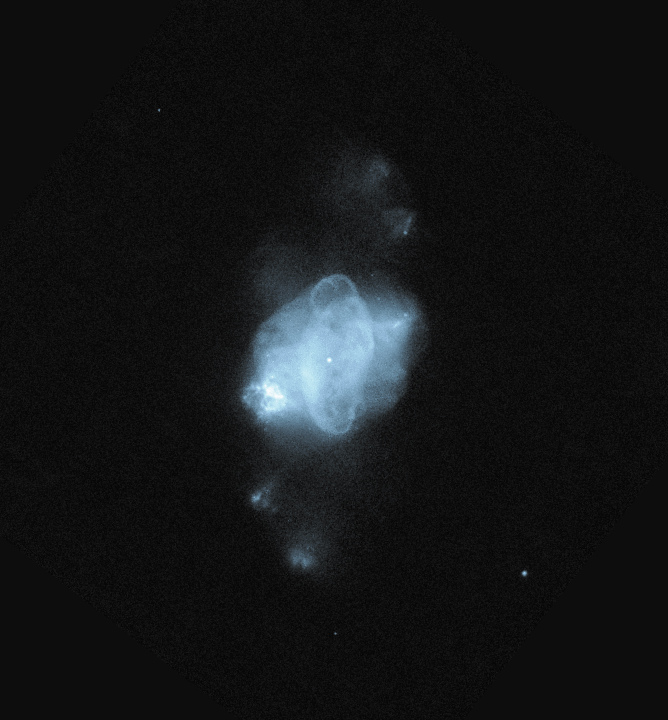
- Image by the Hubble Space Telescope

Observation data: J2000 epoch
- Right ascension: 05^{h} 05^{m} 34.32^{s}
- Declination: +10° 42′ 22.7″
- Distance: ~6,881-19,569 ly
- Apparent diameter: 11" x 8"
- Constellation: Orion
- Designations: PK 190-17 1, PN G190.3-17.7, IRAS 05028+1038, SCM 3

Jonckheere 320 (J320) is an extremely small, bright, and elongated planetary nebula with two or three bipolar lobes. It was discovered by French astronomer R. Jonckheere in 1911 and was initially classified as a double star. In 1916 R. Jonckheere revisited J320 using the Royal Observatory, Greenwich and realized it was not a binary star system.

J320 is a Type II low-excitation PN and polypolar planetary nebula. The distance of J320 is uncertain, with estimates ranging from ~2.11 to ~6 kpc. The apparent size of the nebula is exceptionally small at only 11" x 8" and 7.7" x 4.8" for the inner halo while the physical diameter is estimated to be ~0.7 ly across its main axis. The central core is surrounded by high-velocity knots.

== Central star ==
J 320 was mistaken for a double system. The central star is a hot, evolved white dwarf precursor with a T_eff = 85,000 K and a mass = 0.79 M_{☉}. The star was classified as a weak emission line star. The star has an apparent magnitude of ~13.5, and its luminosity is 40x of the Sun.
