= NGC 6578 =

Planetary nebula in the constellation Sagittarius

Emission nebula
- Planetary nebula
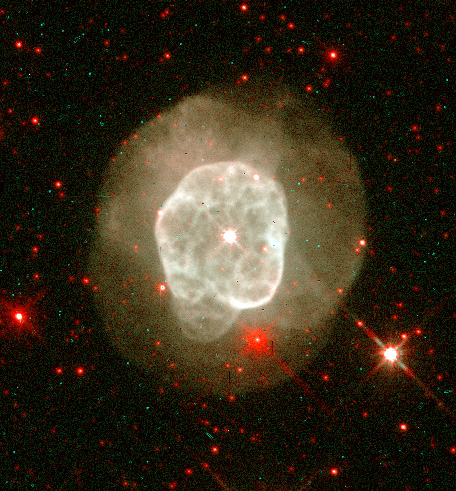
- A Hubble Space Telescope (HST) image of NGC 6578. Credit: HST/NASA/ESA. December 17th, 1997

Observation data: J2000 epoch
- Right ascension: 18^{h} 16^{m} 16.5^{s}
- Declination: −20° 27′ 2.7″
- Apparent magnitude (V): 13.5
- Apparent dimensions (V): 8"
- Constellation: Sagittarius
- Designations: ESO 590- 12

NGC 6578 is a planetary nebula located in Sagittarius. It is magnitude 13.5 with diameter 8 arc seconds. It has a 16th magnitude central star, which is an O-type star with a spectral type of Of. It is seen near the star 16 Sagittarii.

== See also ==
- List of NGC objects
