= LoTr 4 =

Faint planetary nebula in the constellation Centaurus

Nebula
- Planetary nebula

Observation data: J2000 epoch
- Right ascension: 11^{h} 52^{m} 29.22^{s}
- Declination: −42° 17′ 38.6″
- Distance: 19,569 ly
- Apparent diameter: 30x26"
- Constellation: Centaurus
- Designations: PN G 291.4+19.2, PK 291+19 1

LoTr 4 is a planetary nebula with two separate shells. LoTr 4 was discovered along with 11 other planetary nebulae under the LoTr Catalog and was discovered in 1980 by astronomers A.J Longmore and S.B. Tritton using the UK Schmidt Telescope.

LoTr 4 has a outer shell with a angular radius of 13.5" and an inner shell with a angular radius of 3". The nebula has a distance of approximately 6 kpc and a radius of 0.6 pc, this means that the inner and outer shells have linear radii of 0.22 and 0.39 pc. The nebula has an average expansion velocity of 20 km/sec. LoTr 4 has a stellar mass of 0.65 ± 0.11 and a stellar radius of 0.16–0.36.

== Central star ==
The star has a radius range of 7.5"-13.5". It is also very hydrogen-deficient. Some studies indicate it is a born-again post-AGB star. The present position of LoTr 4 indicates a time of ~300 years since its second "born-again" departure from the AGB. The central star has an effective temperature of ~120,000 K.
