= Jonckheere 900 =

Planetary nebula in the constellation Gemini

J900
Emission nebula
- Planetary nebula
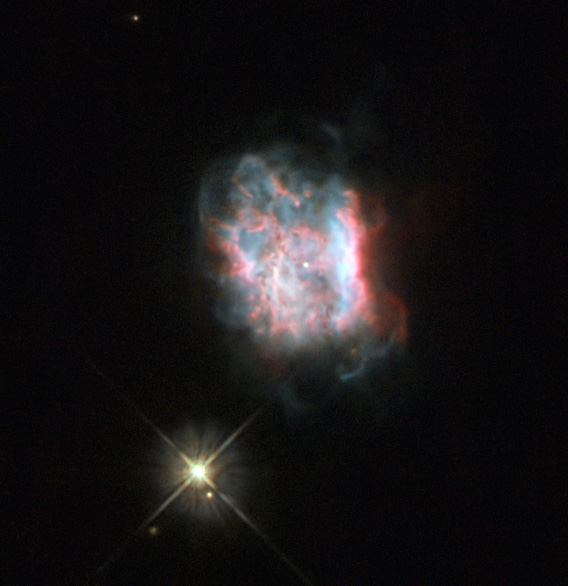
- Image taken by the Hubble Space Telescope

Observation data: J2000 epoch
- Right ascension: 06^{h} 25^{m} 57.237^{s}
- Declination: +17° 47′ 27.53″
- Distance: 12,687-19,569 ly
- Constellation: Gemini
- Designations: PK 194+02 1, PN G194.2+02.5, VV 28, ARO 92

J900 (also known as Jonckheere 900) is a bipolar planetary nebula discovered in 1912 by French astronomer R. Jonckheere using the Lille University observatory, he initially thought it was a double star, the Hubble Space Telescope later determined the object was not a double star.

J900 has a distance ranging from 3.89 to 6 kiloparsecs (kpc) with an average value of ~4.6 kpc, this shows that the ionization front is located at ~8.5 arcseconds away from the central star. The nebula has a temperature floor of ~829 K, which is from a H2 temperature of 755±36 K.

The J900 nebula was detected to have Kr III and Se IV lines. Forbidden Lines of [Kr], [Rb], and [Xe] were detected in the BOES spectrum while the F line was detected using the mid-IR Spitzer infrared spectrograph. The nebula features H2 lines emitted from both a ~670 K warm and a ~3200 K hot region.

A unnamed faint field star located roughly 11 arcseconds away from the central star is located next to J900, giving the illusion of a double system.

== Central star ==
The star has an effective temperature of ~134,800 K calculated using the observed I(He II 4686 Å)/I(H β) ratio. The star evolved from an initial mass of ~2.0 M⊙. The central star has a visual magnitude of 17.8 mag.
