= NGC 6153 =

Planetary nebula in the constellation Scorpius

Emission nebula
- Planetary nebula
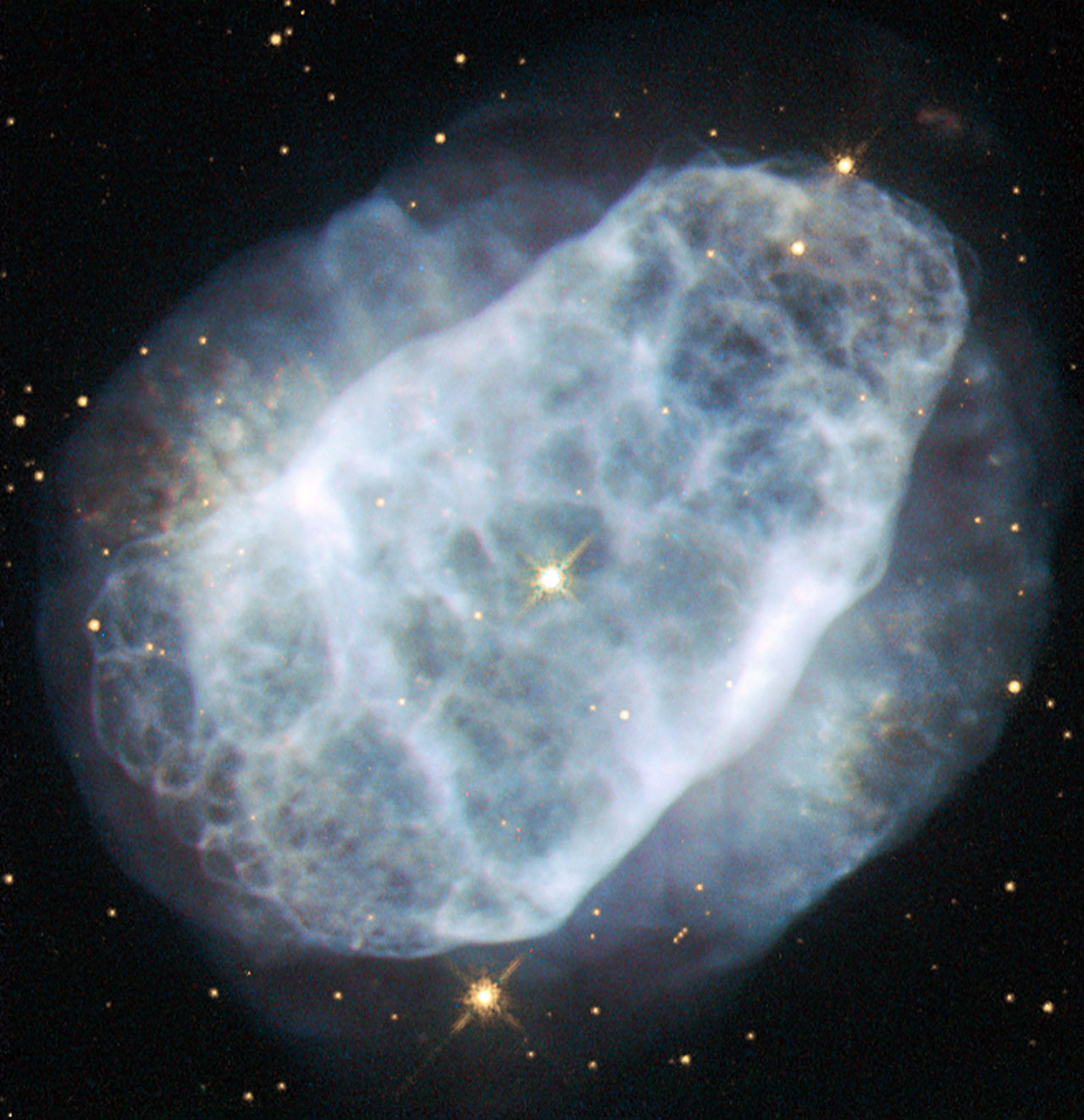
- HST image of NGC 6153

Observation data: J2000 epoch
- Class: II
- Right ascension: 16^{h} 31^{m} 30.57^{s}
- Declination: −40° 15′ 12.6″
- Distance: 4,890 ± 980 ly
- Apparent magnitude (V): 10.6
- Apparent diameter: 30″
- Constellation: Scorpius

NGC 6153 is a planetary nebula in the southern constellation Scorpius. It was discovered in 1883 by English astronomer Ralph Copeland. This nebula has been observed using telescopes with apertures as small as 80 mm (3.1 in), but a rich Milky Way background can make it difficult to find. It has an apparent visual magnitude of 10.6 and spans an angular diameter of 30″.

This is a roughly symmetrical, bipolar nebula with an expansion velocity of 12.7 to 17.3 km/s. It includes some knots, filaments, and probably a double-shell structure. NGC 6153 has a Peimbert type of I, indicating it is helium and nitrogen rich and the progenitor was a thin disk star. A 1986 analysis of spectra showed this to be an unusual nebula. Nearly all elements in the nebula are overabundant, particularly for nitrogen, neon, sulfur, and argon. In some cases being higher in abundance compared to any other nebula. It was proposed that this discrepancy occurs due to cold, metal-rich, hydrogen deficient knots that have been included in the nebula.

An analysis of Gaia data suggests that the central star may be a binary system. A binary system could explain the abundance discrepancy. While on the cooling track, a white dwarf can undergo a final thermal pulse, causing the star to swell into a helium burning giant that follows nearly the same evolutionary track as the earlier star.
