= NGC 6741 =

Planetary nebula in the constellation Aquila

Emission nebula
- Planetary nebula
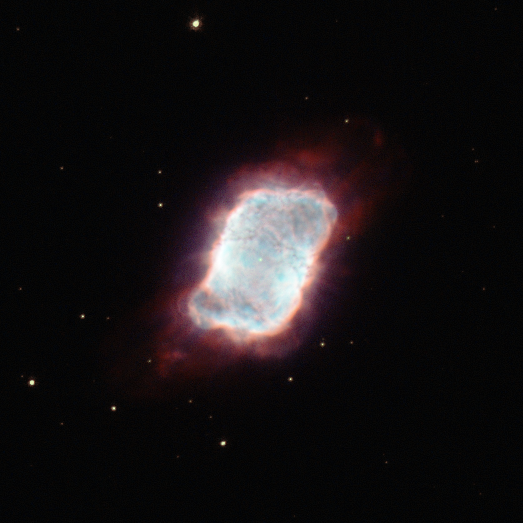
- NASA/ESA Hubble Space Telescope image of NGC 6741. Credit: ESA/Hubble and NASA.

Observation data: J2000 epoch
- Right ascension: 19^{h} 00^{m} 02.3^{s}
- Declination: −00° 31′ 23″
- Apparent magnitude (V): 11
- Apparent dimensions (V): 0.1 arc min
- Constellation: Aquila
- Designations: NGC 6741, GSC2 S3002120466, 2MASS J19023710-0026566, PN VV 217, ** J 475AB, GSC 05128-00058, Phantom Streak Nebula, PN VV' 474, ADS 11967 AB, HD 176946, PK 033-02 1, SCM 225, BD-00 3630, IDS 18575-0035 AB, PN G033.8-02.6, CCDM J19026-0026AB, IRAS 19000-0031, PN ARO 53, GCRV 11499, Jonckheere 475, PN Sa 2-380.

NGC 6741, also known as the Phantom Streak Nebula, is located about 7000 light-years away in the constellation of Aquila (the Eagle). NGC 6741 is classed as a planetary nebula, though no planets are responsible for this billowy cloud; the term came about in the 18th century because the round gas shells resembled the Solar System's outer giant planets in astronomers' telescopes. Although fairly bright, this object appears very small through a typical telescope and was missed by early surveyors of the skies and only spotted in 1882 by Edward Charles Pickering.
