= Humason 1-2 =

Planetary nebula in the constellation Cygnus

Hu 1-2
Emission nebula
- Planetary nebula

Observation data: J2000 epoch
- Right ascension: 21^{h} 33^{m} 08^{s}
- Declination: 39° 38′ 01″
- Apparent diameter: 20-25"
- Constellation: Cygnus
- Designations: PN G086.5-08.8, PK 86-08.1, VV 267

Humason 1-2 (Hu 1-2) is a bipolar hourglass shaped planetary nebula in the constellation Cygnus. Hu 1-2 was discovered by astronomer Milton L. Humason in October 11, 1920.

The distance of Hu 1-2 has never been confirmed, one study gave a lower limit of ~1.17 kiloparsecs (kpc) and a galactocentric distance of approximately ~9 kpc if the distance is approximately ~3.5 kpc. A study identified two bipolar knots moving at velocities greater than 340 kms⁻¹. The kinematical structure of the faint bipolar lobes remains completely unknown, though the lobes have an inclination of ≤10° and a polar expansion velocity of ~150 kms⁻¹, resulting in a lower-limit expansion age of ≤1100 years. The high abundance of He/H and N/O ratios in the bright inner reigons of Hu 1-2 suggest it is a Type I PN, though analysis found abundances of α elements. Hu 1-2 could be a halo PN, but this is unconfirmed. The nebula is enriched in α elements, especially hydrogen and helium.

The NW structure/knot shows O II/O III and He II/Hα ratios greater than those typically seen in the low-ionization structures and outflows of other PNe.

== The central star ==
Type I nature of the nebula indicates that the star descended from a massive intermediate-mass progenitor star, or the abundances of α elements may be a result of a formation of a massive PN progenitor from metal-poor materials.
