= Exposed Cranium nebula =

Planetary nebula in the Vela constellation

Nebula
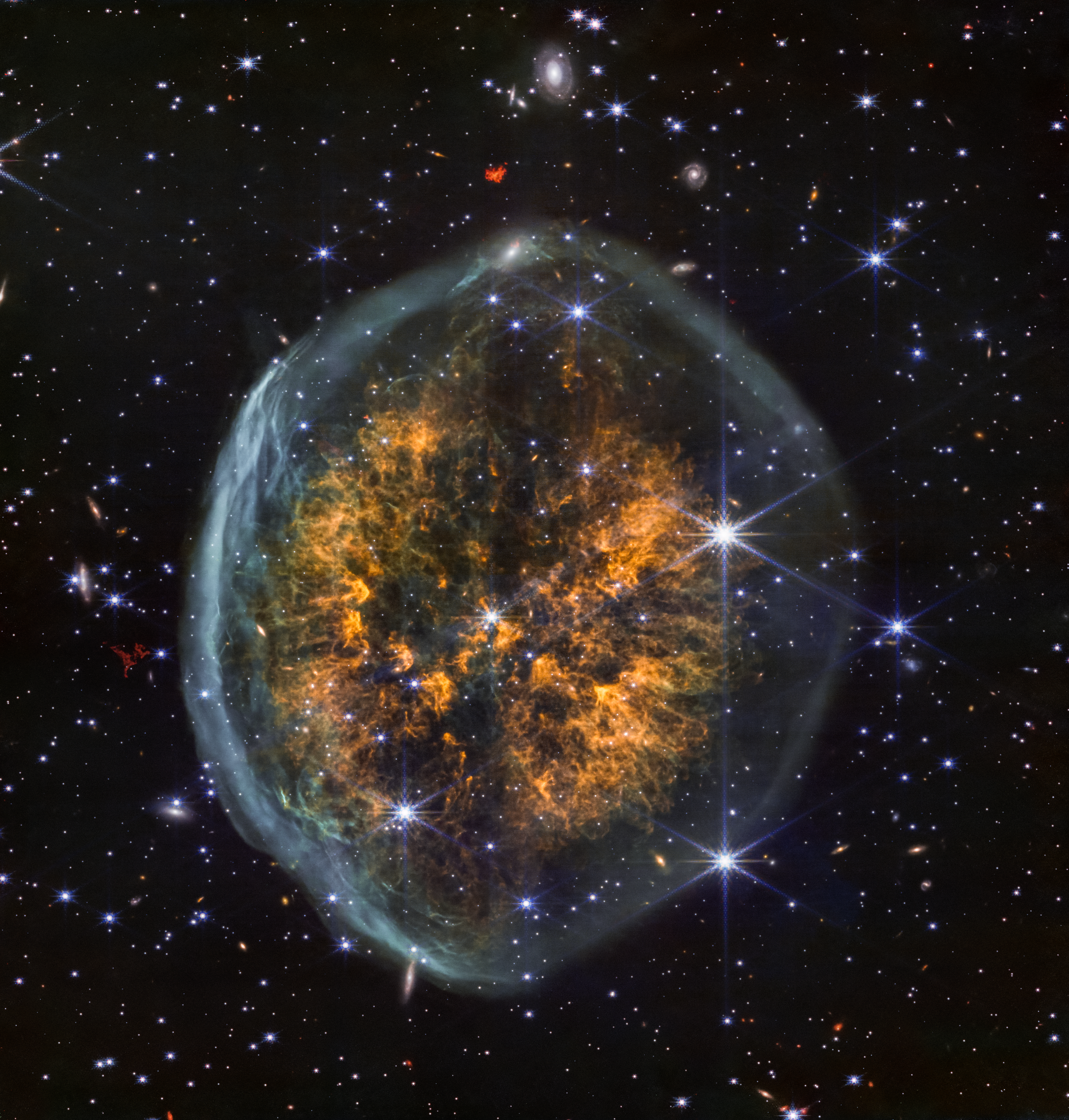
- Image of the nebula using NIRCam on the James Webb Space Telescope (JWST)

Observation data: J2000.0 epoch
- Right ascension: 09^{h} 28^{m} 40.97^{s}
- Declination: −49° 36′ 46.6″
- Distance: 5,000 ly
- Constellation: Vela
- Notable features: Appearance of a brain in a transparent skull
- Designations: PMR 1

The Exposed Cranium nebula (also known as PMR 1) is a planetary nebula located roughly 5,000 light years away from Earth in the constellation of Vela. Its name “exposed cranium” comes from the nebulas described uncanny resemblance to a brain located in a transparent skull. This appearance is made possible by a dark lane running vertically down the middle of the nebula.

The nebula is formed from a large and hot dying star ejected material out into space. It is unknown whether this star is massive enough to undergo supernova or just shed its outer shell of material like our Sun will do. The central star is a Wolf-Rayet star with spectral type of [WC4:].

== Description ==
The nebula can be divided into several distinct regions: the outer and inner shells and a dark lane. The outer shell consist mainly of hydrogen while the inner cloud has more of a mix of different elements.

=== Dark lane ===
Running down the middle of the nebula is a distinct dark lane running vertically down through the middle of the nebula. It divides the nebula into left and right hemispheres giving the nebula its “brain-like” appearance. The origin of this lane is possibly from bipolar outflows of gas from the dying star.
