= NGC 5844 =

Planetary nebula in the constellation Triangulum Australe

Emission nebula
- Planetary nebula
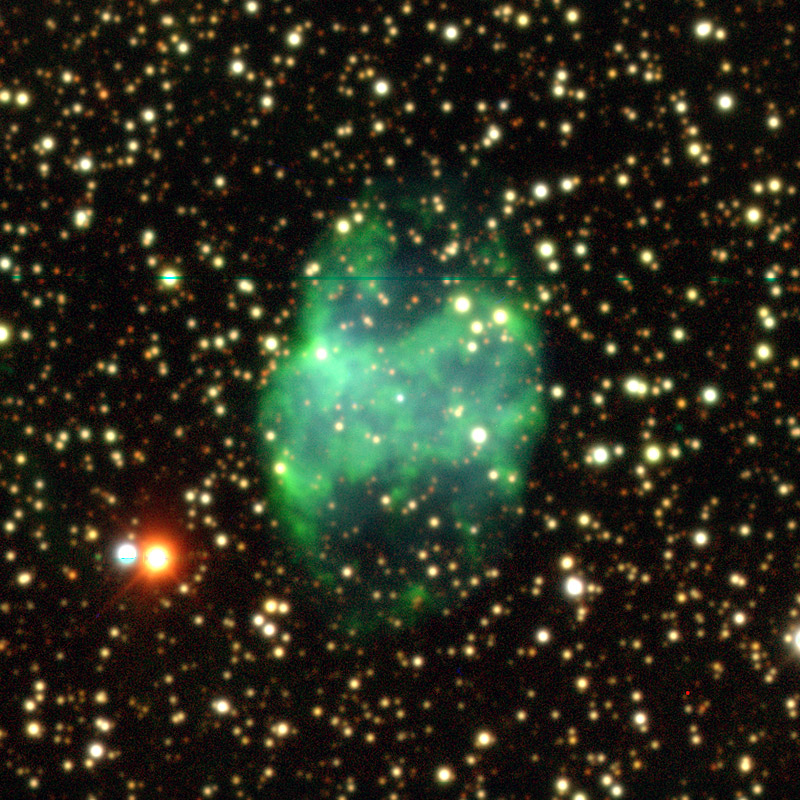
- An image of NGC 5844

Observation data: J2000 epoch
- Right ascension: 15^{h} 12^{m} 52^{s}
- Declination: −64° 46′ 07″
- Distance: 4474.866 ly (1372 pc)
- Apparent magnitude (V): 13.2
- Constellation: Triangulum Australe

Physical characteristics
- Radius: 0.54 ly
- Designations: NGC 5844, ESO 99-1, IRAS 15064-6429

NGC 5844 is a planetary nebula in the constellation Triangulum Australe. It was initially discovered by British astronomer John Herschel on May 2, 1835. Given its magnitude of 13.2, NGC 5844 is visible with the help of a telescope having an aperture of 10 inches (250mm) or more. The object is located approximately 4,474 light years (1372pc) away from the Earth, and is moving towards the Sun at a radial velocity of -0.0002 km/s±0.00013.

== Gallery ==
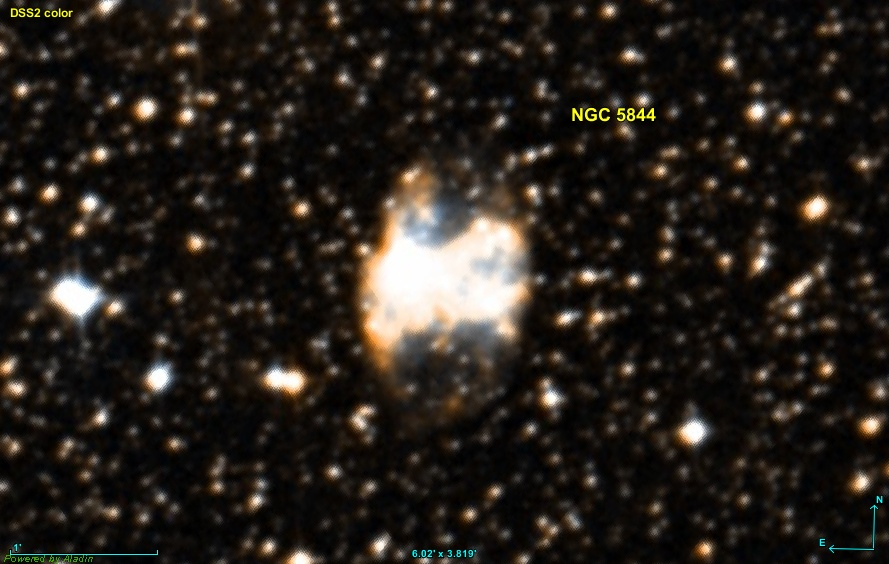
Image created using the Aladin Sky Atlas software from the Strasbourg Astronomical Data Center and DSS (Digitized Sky Survey) data.

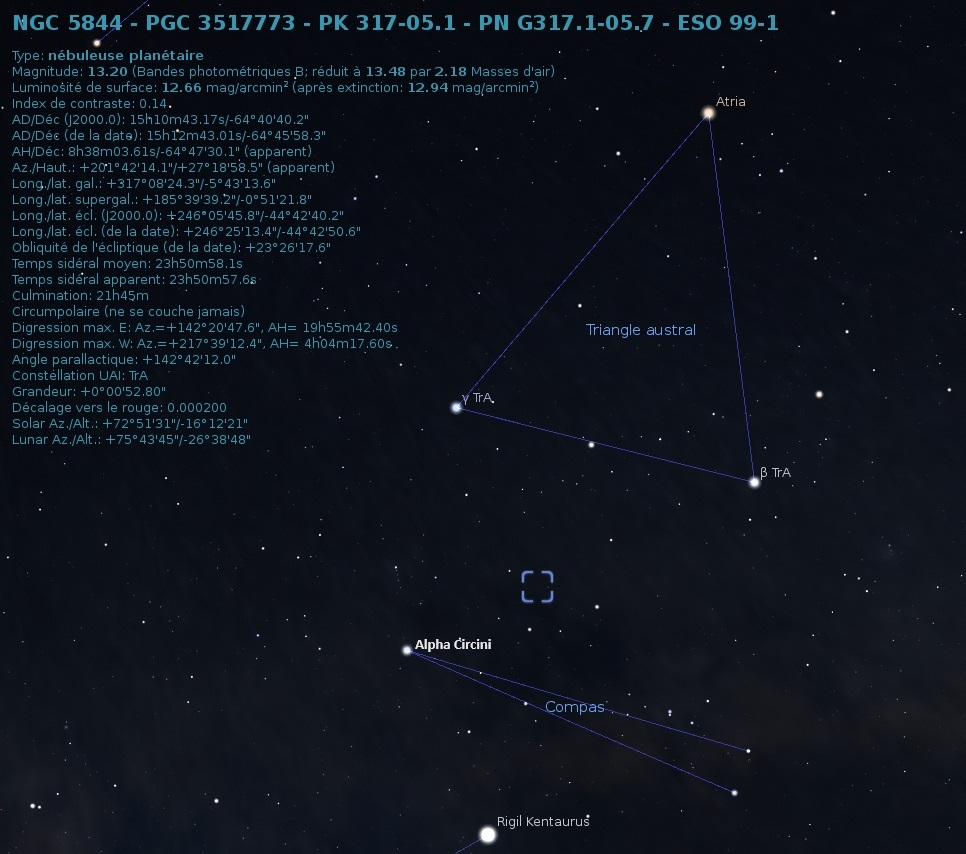
Location of NGC 5844 (Using the open source software Stellarium)
