= Southern Owl Nebula =

Planetary nebula in Hydra

Emission nebula
- Planetary nebula
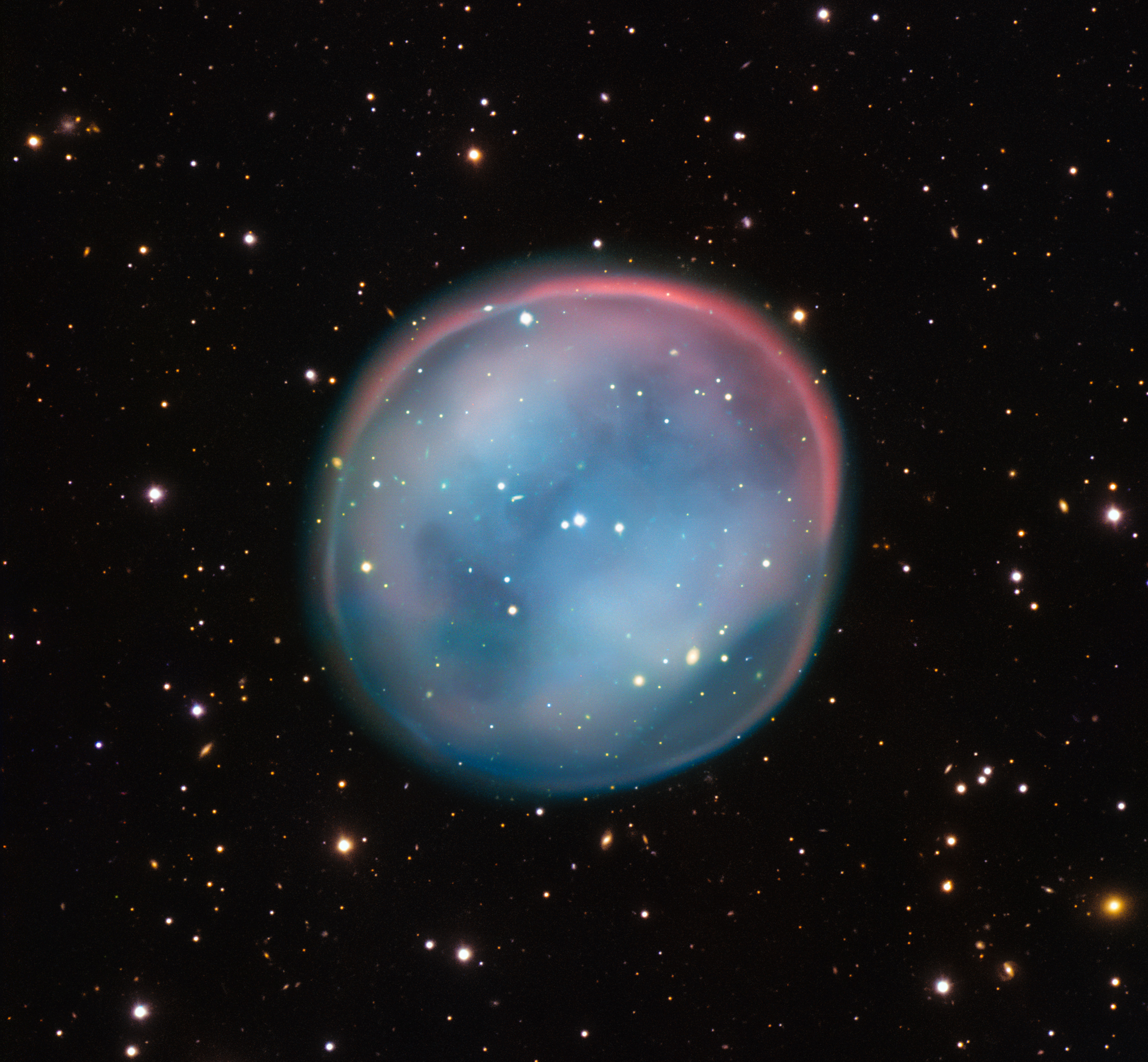
- The Southern Owl Nebula as seen by ESO

Observation data: J2000 epoch
- Right ascension: 11^{h} 26^{m} 43.78^{s}
- Declination: −34° 22′ 11.4″
- Distance: 2030 ly
- Apparent magnitude (V): +17.4
- Constellation: Hydra

Physical characteristics
- Radius: 2 ly
- Designations: PLN 283+25.1 and ESO 378-1

The Southern Owl Nebula (PLN 283+25.1, ESO 378-1) is a planetary nebula located in the constellation Hydra. The nebula lies at a distance of 2,030 light years from Earth.

It is named so because of its resemblance to the Owl Nebula in Ursa Major. The nebula is notably symmetric, round, and has a diameter of approximately four light-years.
