= MWP 1 =

Planetary nebula in the constellation Cygnus

Emission nebula
- Planetary nebula
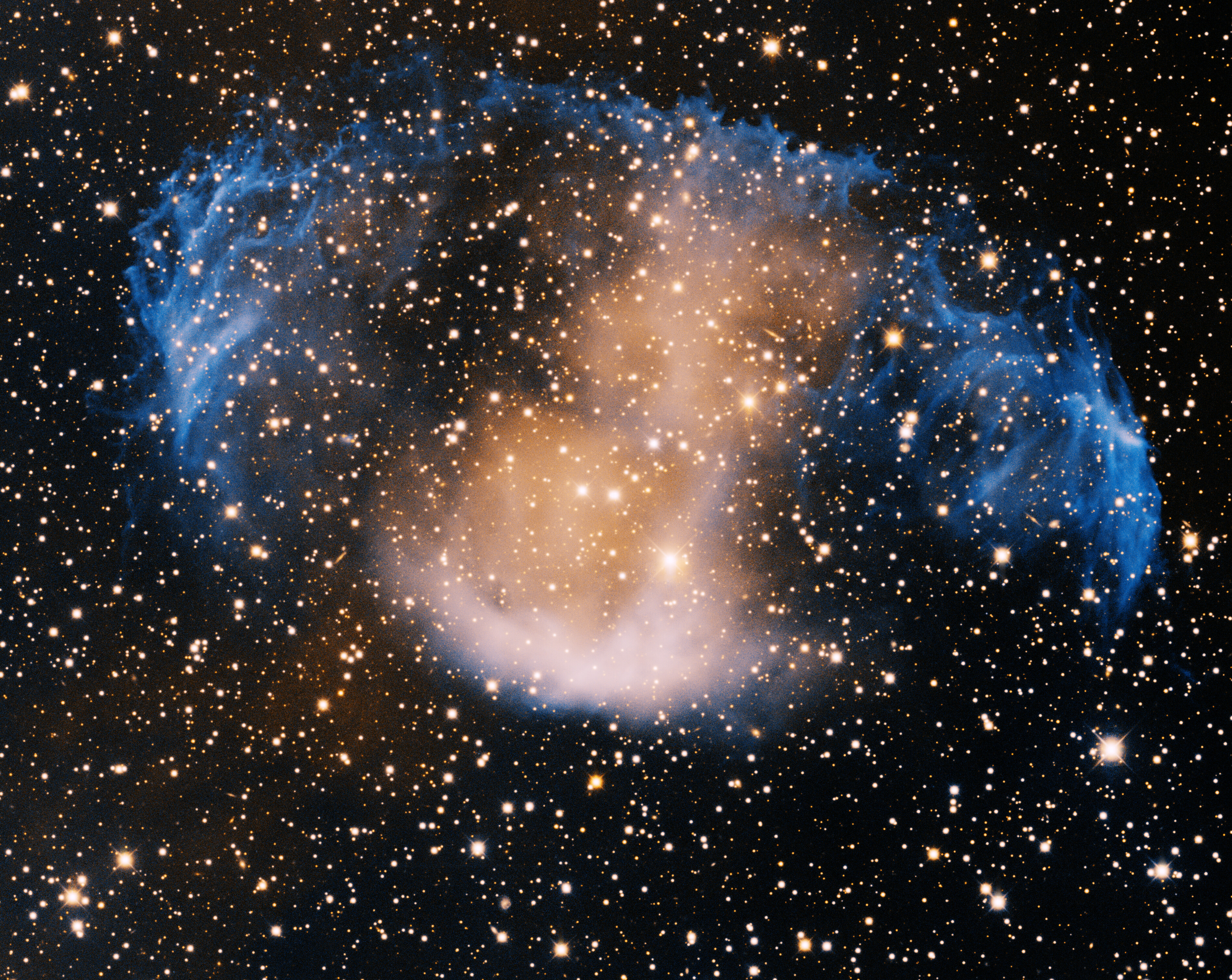
- Image of MWP 1 from the mosaic camera on the Nicholas U. Mayall Telescope at Kitt Peak

Observation data: J2000 epoch
- Right ascension: 21^{h} 16^{m} 30^{s}
- Declination: +34° 11′ 42″
- Distance: (~503 pc) ~1,637 ly
- Constellation: Cygnus
- Designations: PK 080-10 1, PN G080.3-10.4, PN G080.8-10.6, RX J2117.1+3412

MWP 1, or the Methuselah Nebula, is a large planetary nebula surrounding the X-ray source RX J2117.1+3412. MWP 1 was first noticed in 1987 by Alain Maury at the Palomar Schmidt telescope. In 1992 astronomers Motch, Werner, and Pakull (MWP) identified the X-ray source RX J2117.1+3412 and in the same year Appleton, Kawaler, and Eitter discovered a large planetary nebula surrounding RX J2117.1+3412.

MWP 1 shows a bright inner region and an extensive bipolar shape containing filaments and arcs. The shape of the outer emission is a very faint "S-shape". The position angle of the major axis for larger structure is 50° north through east. The maximum extent of MWP 1 is 13 arcminutes, this provides a linear diameter of approximately 5.3 pc. The filaments of MWP 1 are similar to He 2-104, which could help explain the origin of the filaments.

MWP has an expansion age of about 10^{5} years, based on an expansion velocity of 20 km/s.

The inner regions of MWP 1 have a typical surface brightness of 1.5x10-15 ergs cm⁻² s⁻² arcsec⁻² for Hα and 1.2x10-16 ergs cm⁻² s⁻² arcsec⁻² for O III, while the hook feature to the south has a surface brightness 1.7 times brighter than Hα and 2.1 times brighter than O III, and the average brightness in the filaments is 9.4x10-17 ergs cm⁻² s⁻² arcsec⁻² for O III and approximately 5.1x10-17 ergs cm⁻² s⁻² arcsec⁻² for the Hα line.

== RX J2117.1+3412 ==
X-ray source and central star RX J2117.1+3412 lies at the "knee" of the evolutionary track where the star reaches maximum effective temperature and enters the white dwarf cooling sequence. The star has an age fewer than 10⁴ years, assuming it is a helium-burning star with a mass of 0.60 M_{☉}. Recent observations of RX J2117.1+3412 show that the star pulsates between 600 seconds and 1,000 seconds. RX J2117.1+3412 is a PG 1159 star, a classification that was proven by the discovery of this nebula. The star has a surface temperature of approximately 15,000 K.
