= CVMP 1 =

Planetary nebula in the constellation of Circinus

Nebula
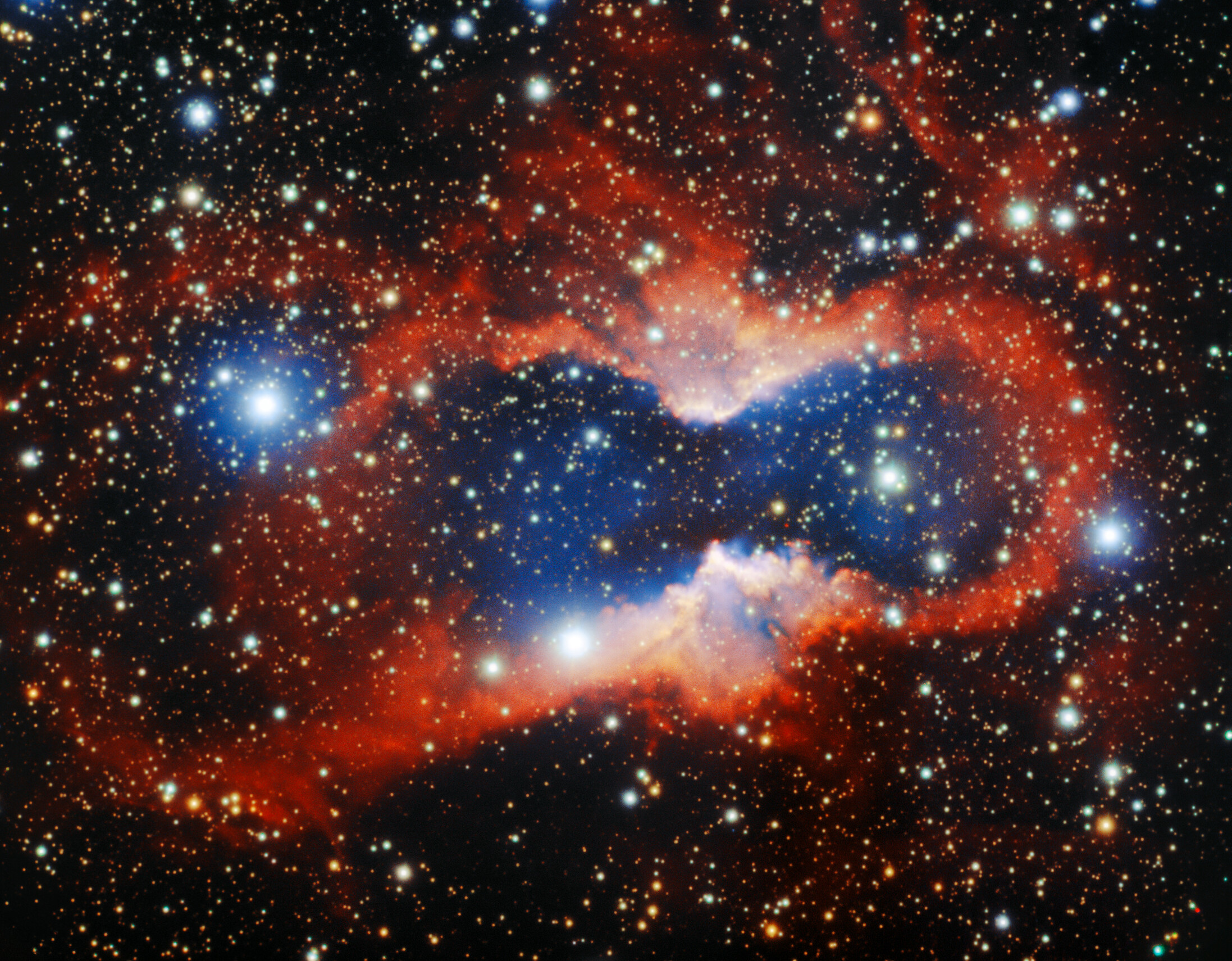
- A composite color image from the Gemini Observatory of the CVMP 1 nebula

Observation data: J2000 epoch
- Right ascension: 15 9 25.64
- Declination: -55° 32' 54.10"
- Distance: 6500 ly ly
- Constellation: Circinus
- Notable features: Large and enriched with elements
- Designations: Marsalkova 252, PK 321+02 3, PN G321.6+02.2, WRAY 19-40

CVMP 1 is a very large planetary nebula located around 6500 light years from Earth in the constellation of Circinus. It is often described as a hourglass-shaped nebula. The nebula has been enriched with chemical elements such as helium and nitrogen.

It is formed by a dying red giant star expelling its outer shell of material into space. The nebula started to form around 10,000 years ago. Eventually the star will die and leave behind a stellar remnant such as a white dwarf. The progenitor star has a core temperature of 130,000 degrees Celsius. Despite its high temperature, it had cooled in the past substantially. For comparison, the core temperature of the Sun is around 25 million degrees Celsius.
