= Abell 12 =

Planetary nebula in the constellation Orion

Emission nebula
- Planetary nebula
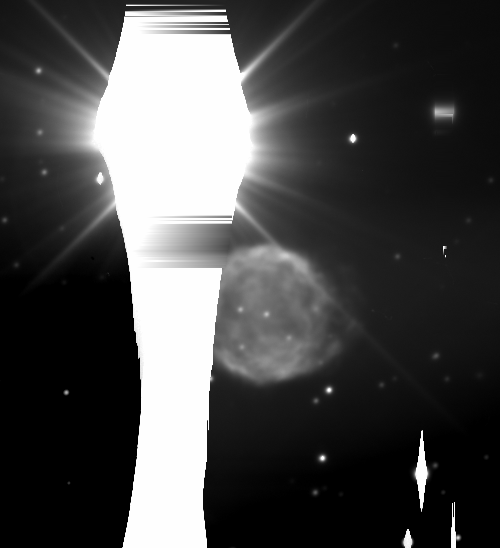
- Planetary Nebula Abell 12 with DECam r-band filter. Mu Orionis is on the upper left and saturates large parts of the image.

Observation data: J2000 epoch
- Right ascension: 06^{h} 02^{m} 21.4^{s}
- Declination: +09° 39′ 07″
- Constellation: Orion
- Notable features: Obscured by a foreground star
- Designations: PNG 198.6-06.3 PK 198-06.1 ARO 120

Abell 12, also known as PNG 198.6-06.3, PK 198-06.1 and ARO 220, is a planetary nebula located in the constellation of Orion. The nebula is 6,900 light years away from Earth, north of Betelgeuse. Abell 12 is known as "the hidden planetary" because of the foreground star Mu Orionis making it difficult to observe and Abell 12 being at an apparent magnitude of about 14. The best way for it to be observed is through narrowband filters such as H-alpha and O-III. The northern outer red hydrogen shell has been ruptured allowing the interior oxygen to spill out.

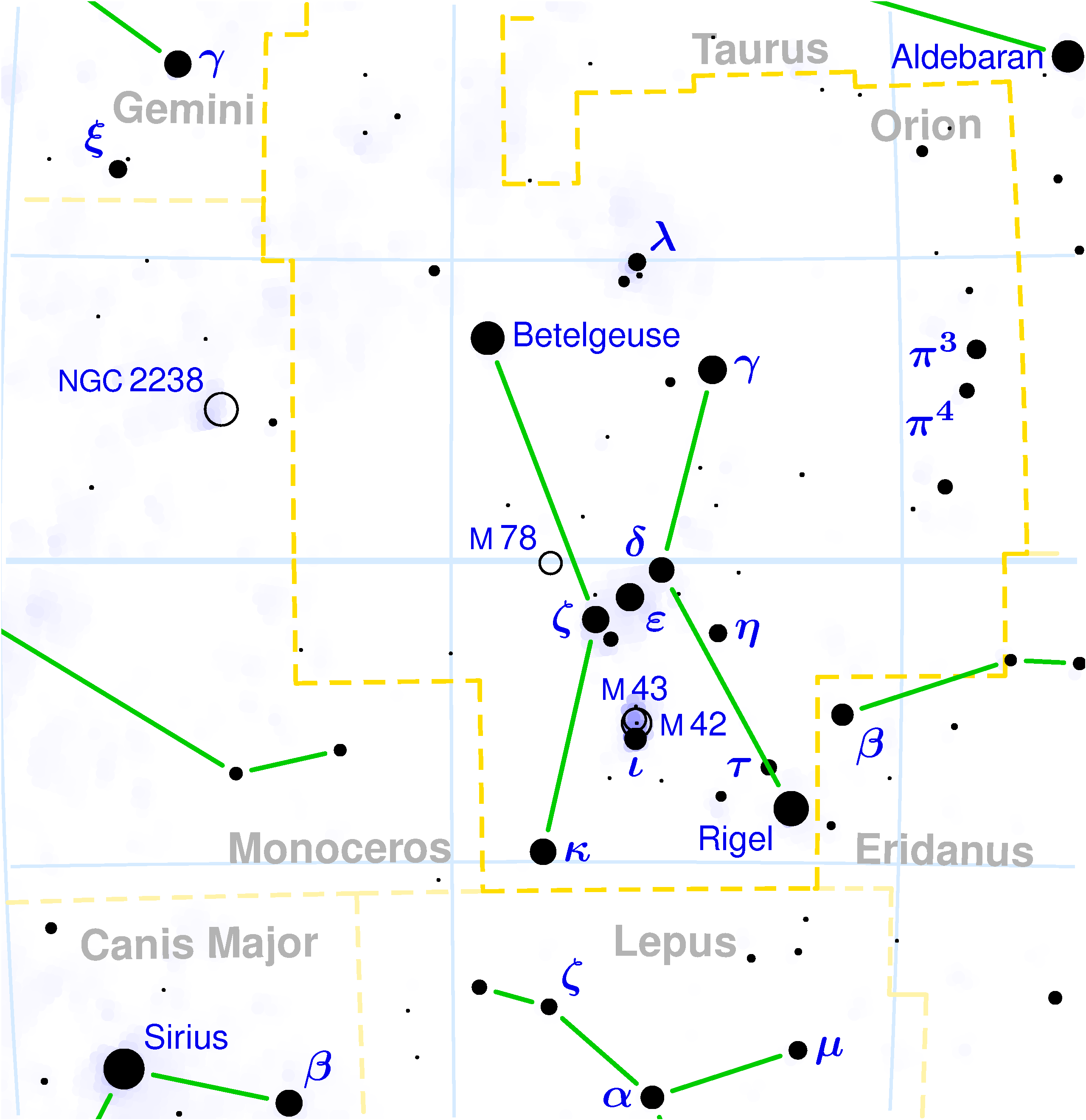
Constellation map of Orion
