= WeBo 1 =

Planetary nebula in the constellation Cassiopeia

Emission nebula
- Planetary nebula
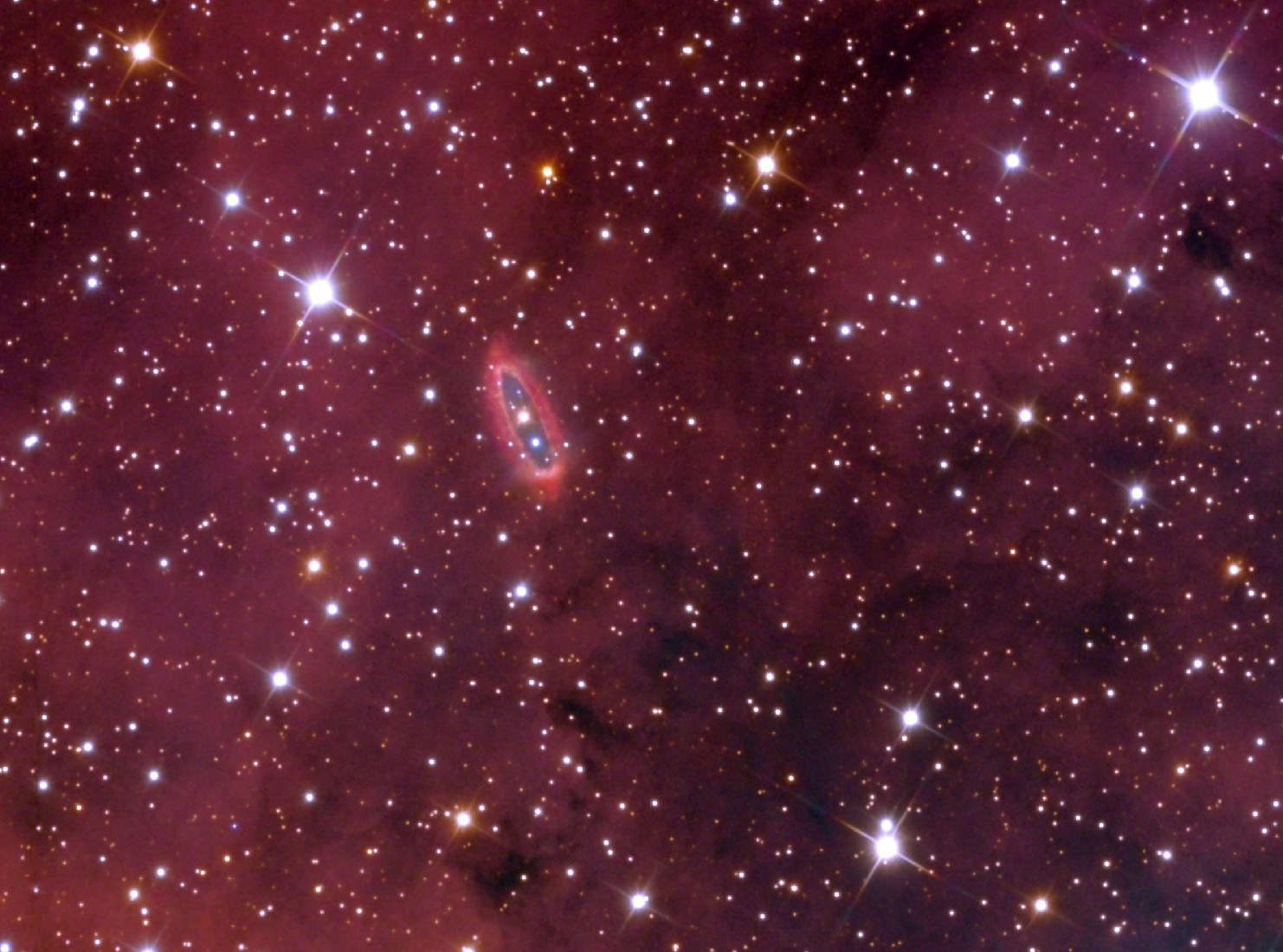
- HaRGB Image of WeBo 1 taken from the Mount Lemmon Sky Center

Observation data: J2000 epoch
- Right ascension: 02^{h} 40^{m} 14.37^{s}
- Declination: +61° 09′ 16.77″
- Distance: 2772-7175 ly
- Constellation: Cassiopeia
- Designations: PN G135.6+01.0, 2MASS J02401437+6109168

WeBo 1 is a faint ring-shaped planetary nebula discovered in 1996 by astronomers Howard E. Bond and Ronald F. Webbink while they verified the coordinates for the nearby X-ray source LS I +61 303. WeBo 1 sits near the Heart Nebula.

WeBo 1 exhibits characteristics similar to Abell 35-type nuclei. At a distance of 2.2 kpc, its major axis is 0.48 ± 0.26 pc, WeBo 1 has an estimated age of 12,000 ± 6,000 years if 4.7 days is the rotation period.

== V1169 Cassiopeiae ==
V1169 Cas has the properties of a Barium star or "Ba II star", despite being a K0 III star, V1169 Cas appears red due to interstellar reddening of E(V-I) ≃ 0.77, which corresponds to an E(B-V) ≃ 0.57 or 0.70 using the formula from Warren P. R. and his colleagues. Based on an mass of 1.5 M_{☉}, the primary star has a radius of 9 ± 5 R_{☉}. The observed magnitude, reddening, and angular radius imply an upper limit distance of 2.2 to 2.4 kpc and a lower limit distance of 0.75 kpc. The star system maintains a rotation period of 4.7 days, with a visual magnitude of +1.3 -0.9+1.6 if the distance is 1.6 ± 0.85 kpc.

Although V1169 Cas was thought to be a single star system, a surplus of ultraviolet flux suggests the presence of a companion white dwarf (WD) or Planetary Nebula Nucleus (PNN). This companion is estimated to have a Teff of 40,000 K and a radius less than 0.056 R.
