= Abell 36 =

Planetary nebula in the constellation Virgo

Emission nebula
- Planetary nebula
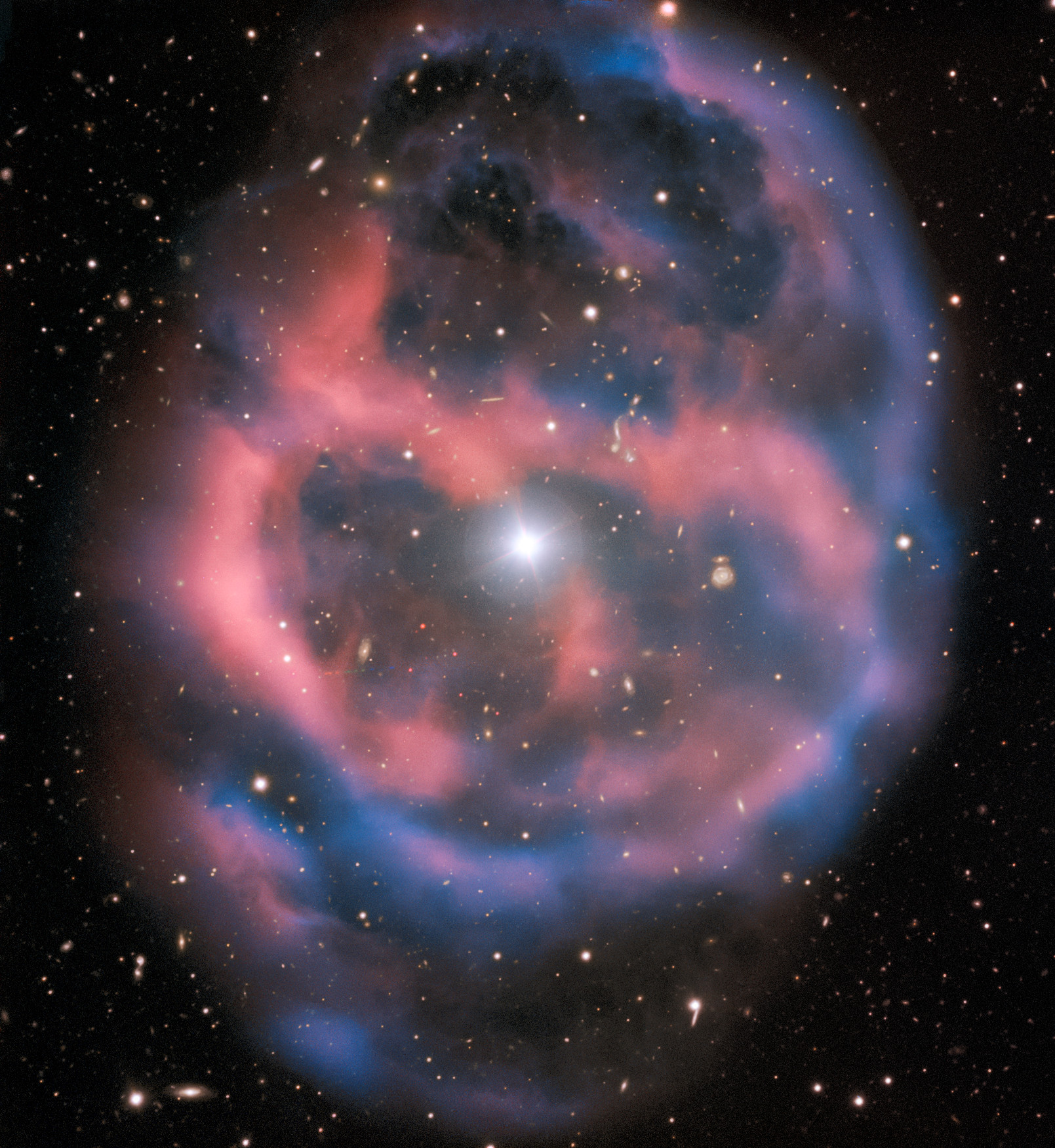
- As seen from the Very Large Telescope

Observation data: J2000 epoch
- Right ascension: 13^{h} 40^{m} 41.34369^{s}
- Declination: −19° 52′ 55.3200″
- Distance: 780 ly (240 pc) ly
- Apparent magnitude (V): Integrated: 12.2–14.3; Central star: 15.4
- Apparent dimensions (V): 6.117′ × 6.117′
- Constellation: Virgo

Physical characteristics
- Radius: 1.5 ly (0.46 pc) ly
- Notable features: A unique and detailed PN
- Designations: PK 318+41.1, PN G 318.4+41.4

Abell 36 is a faint barrel shaped planetary nebula located 780 light years from Earth in the constellation of Virgo. It was discovered by the American astronomer George Ogden Abell in 1955.

The nebula surrounds a dying sun-like star that is shedding out its outer layers forming Abell 36. The star is evolving towards its white dwarf phase of life. The nebula is estimated to have been formed around 10,000 years ago.
