= M1-63 =

Bipolar nebula in Scutum

M1-63 Nebula
Emission nebula
- Planetary nebula
- Bipolar
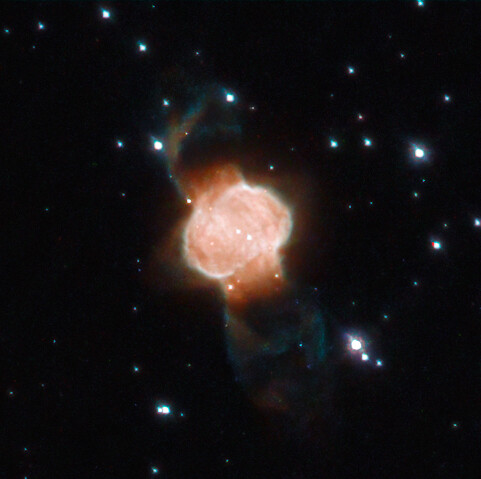
- M1-63 by the Hubble Space Telescope

Observation data: J2000 epoch
- Right ascension: 18^{h} 51^{m} 30.96^{s}
- Declination: −13° 10′ 37.07″
- Constellation: Scutum
- Designations: VV 209, IRAS 18486-1314, 2MASS J18513095-1310367

M1-63 (catalogued as VV 209, IRAS 18486-1314 and as 2MASS J18513095-1310367) is a bipolar planetary nebula in the constellation of Scutum.

It is centered about 32000 ly away from Earth.

== See also ==
- List of nebulae
- Wikipedia Project: Astronomical Objects
