= DdDm 1 =

Planetary nebula in the constellation Hercules

Emission nebula
- Planetary nebula

Observation data: J2000 epoch
- Right ascension: 16^{h} 40^{m} 18.15^{s}
- Declination: 38° 42′ 19.9″
- Distance: ~25,000±~63,274 ly
- Apparent diameter: 1.0"-1.5"
- Constellation: Hercules
- Designations: PK 061+41 1, PN G061.9+41.3, Dd 1

DdDm 1 (Dd 1) is a planetary nebula (PN) located in the galactic halo. this nebula features a blue stellar-like appearance with an elliptical gas and dust structure. DdDm 1 was discovered by Soviet astronomers Dolidze M. V. and Dzimselejsvili G. N. in 1966.

DdDm 1 is a metal-deficient highly carbon-poor PN and is a rare field halo PN, this nebula differs from other halo PNe because it is the only known oxygen-rich halo PN. This shows that DdDm 1 experienced neither a third dredge-up (TDU) event nor a hot bottom burning during the AGB phase.

The Fe III 5270 Å emission is noticeably more compact than that of the O III 4959 Å emission, with a major-axis measuring 0.61 arcseconds and 1.03 arcseconds respectively. DdDm 1 is enriched in Neon, Oxygen, Sulfur, Neon, and Argon, these elements produced two emission lines, a few forbidden lines, and a lot of recombination lines. This shows that the abundances from recombination lines are larger than forbidden lines, by a factor of 10 ∼ 100.

The heliocentric radial velocity of DdDm 1 is -309.14±1.22 km sec⁻¹. Some studies suggest the planetary nebula could be an extragalactic PN because of the heliocentric velocity. The planetary nebula and the previously mentioned high heliocentric radial velocity of roughly ~310 km/s confirms that it belongs to the galactic halo population rather than the galactic disc population.

The central star has an effective temperature of 38,000-55,000 K and a luminosity of 1000-3000 L_{☉} which corresponds to an initial mass of ~1 M_{☉} for the progenitor star on the H–R diagram. A study suggested if DdDm 1 evolved from a single star with an initial mass of ∼0.9 M_{☉}, which is typical for stars in the galactic halo, its evolutionary timescale should be too slow to evolve into a PN. The ∼0.9 M_{☉} mass star should end its life as a white dwarf (WD) with a mass of ∼0.56 M_{☉}.
