= IC 4642 =

Helium and Nitrogen depleted planetary nebula

Nebula
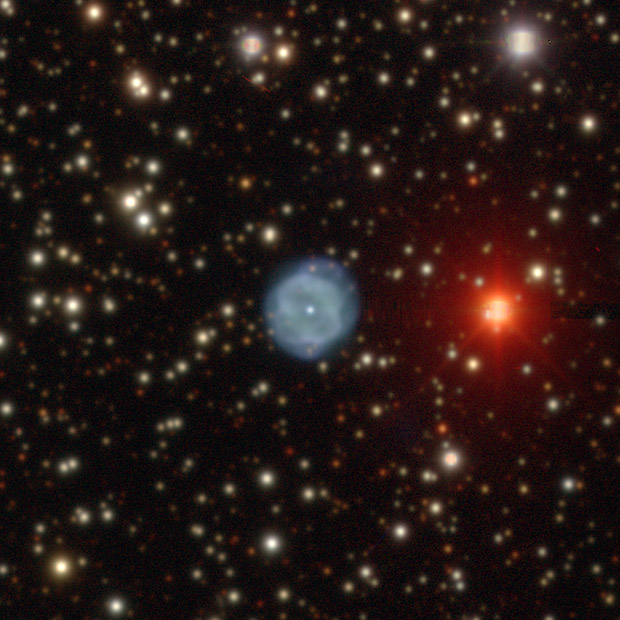
- The IC 4642 nebula.

Observation data: {{{epoch}}} epoch
- Class: Planetary nebula
- Right ascension: 17h 13m 51s
- Declination: -55 25’ 39”
- Notable features: Helium and Nitrogen depleted

IC 4642 is a planetary nebula located in the constellation of Ara. It is elliptical in shape with multiple shells. It is depleted in the elements helium and nitrogen.

== Central star ==
The central star in IC 4642 is a variable star with no definitive spectral classification. It has been referred to as an absorption line star. It may be accompanied by a sub-stellar companion object.
