= NGC 7048 =

Planetary nebula in the constellation Cygnus

Emission nebula
- Planetary nebula
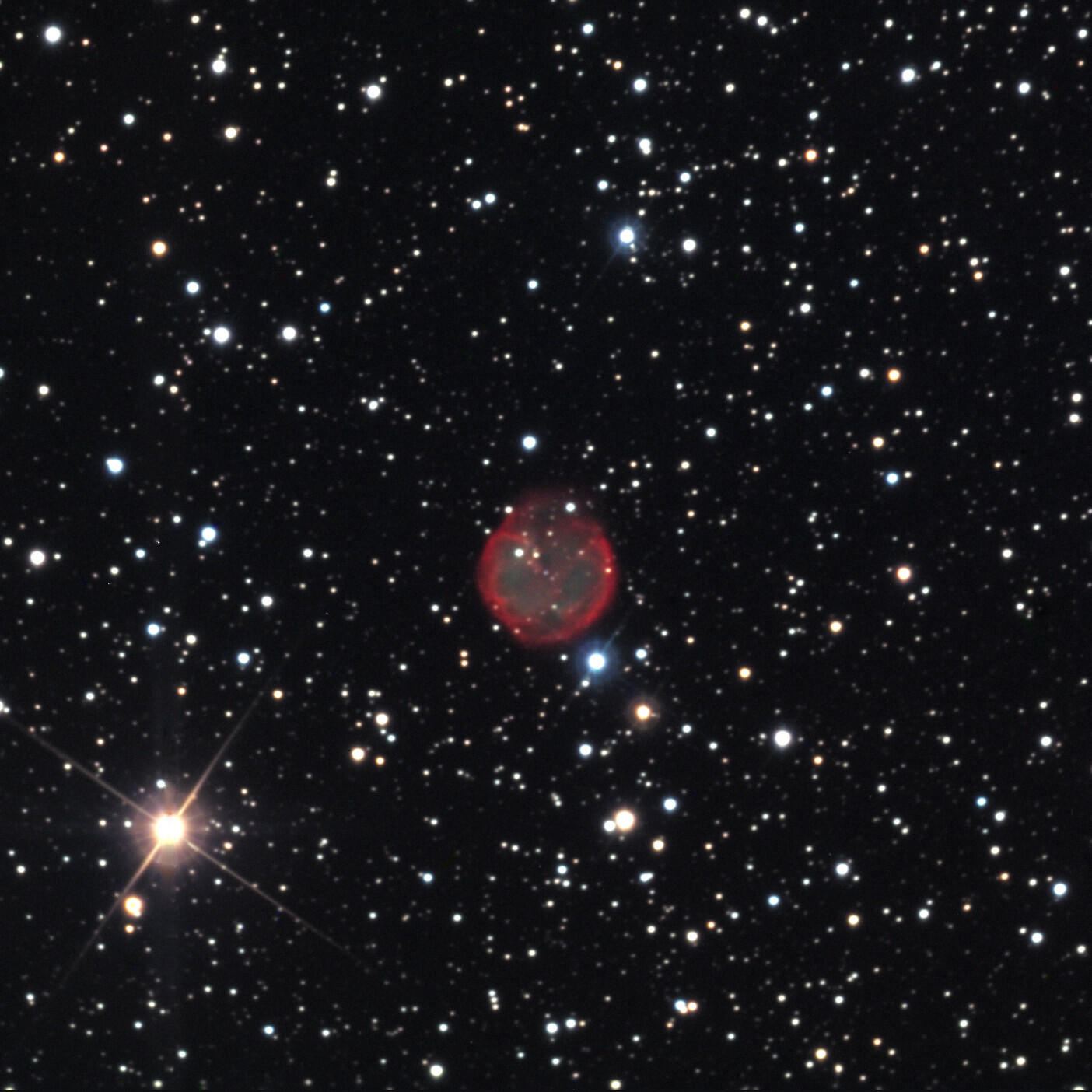

Observation data: J2000 epoch
- Right ascension: 21^{h} 14^{m} 15.25^{s}
- Declination: +46° 17′ 16.1″
- Distance: 5260 ly (1613 pc)
- Apparent magnitude (V): 12.1
- Apparent diameter: 1.02′
- Constellation: Cygnus
- Designations: PK 088-01 1, PN ARO 41, IRAS 21124+4604

NGC 7048, also known as the Peek-a-Boo Nebula, is a planetary nebula in the constellation of Cygnus. The bright star to the lower left of the nebula is a magnitude 10.5 star, designated TYC 3589-4652-1. The nebula is slightly brighter along the west and east sides. This planetary nebula has an apparent magnitude of 12.1. NGC 7048 was discovered by Édouard Stephan on 19 October 1878 using a 31.5-inch reflector.

The central star of NGC 7048 is thought to be a white dwarf. The planetary nebula itself has an elliptical shape; from its low surface brightness it is thought to be highly evolved.

== See also ==
- List of NGC objects (7001–7840)
