= HFG1 =

Planetary nebula located in Cassiopeia

Nebula
- Image of HFG1 from the Mosaic camera on the Mayall 4-meter telescope at Kitt Peak National Observatory

Observation data: J2000 epoch
- Subtype: Planetary nebula
- Right ascension: 3 2 58.62
- Declination: 64° 50' 10.92"
- Constellation: Cassiopeia

HFG1 is a very old planetary nebula located in the Constellation of Cassiopeia. The nebula was produced by V664 Cassiopeia, a binary star system. The distinct fist-shape of this nebula comes from the star system moving rapidly across the galaxy and ramming into the interstellar medium, which creates a blue colored bowshock and a red colored trail.

It was discovered in 1982 along with another nebula Abell 6. The HFG stands for Heckathorn-Fesen-Gull.
