= NGC 5307 =

Planetary nebula in the constellation Centaurus

Emission nebula
- Planetary nebula
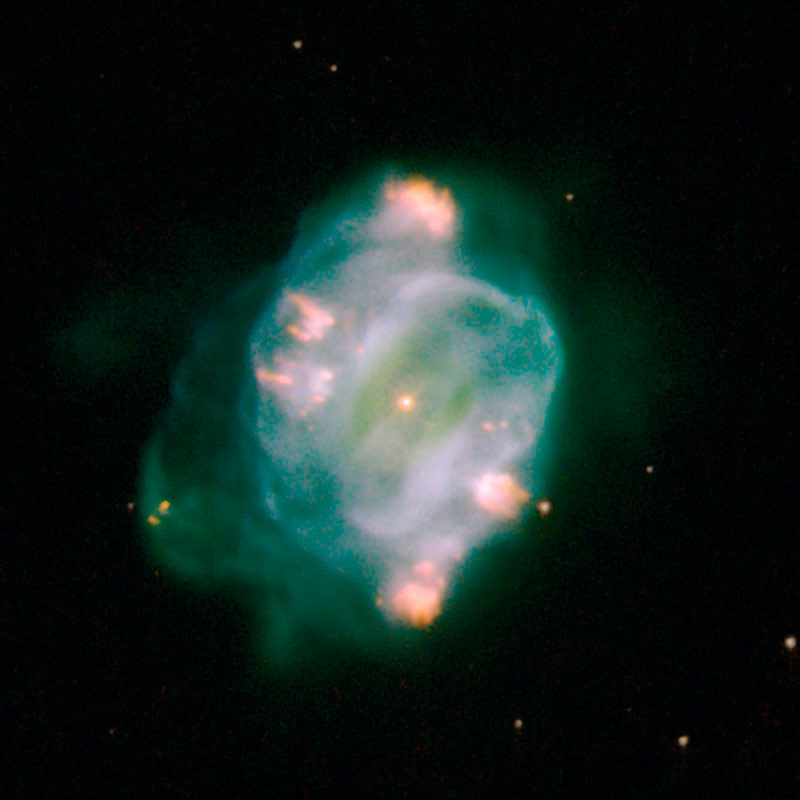
- A false color image of NGC 5307 by the HST

Observation data: J2000 epoch
- Right ascension: 13^{h} 51^{m} 3.3^{s}
- Declination: −51° 12′ 20.7″
- Distance: 10.55 kly (3.235 kpc) ly
- Apparent magnitude (V): 11.2
- Apparent dimensions (V): 18.8″
- Constellation: Centaurus
- Designations: ESO=221-11

NGC 5307 is a planetary nebula in the southern constellation of Centaurus, positioned less than 3° to the northeast of the star Epsilon Centauri. It was discovered by English astronomer John Herschel on April 15, 1836. The nebula is located at a distance of approximately 10.6 kilolight-years from the Sun. The central star, designated PNG 312.3+10.5, is a weak emission-line star, superficially similar to the WC subtype of Wolf–Rayet stars. It has a spectral class of O(H)3.5 V.

This is a Type IIb/III planetary nebula with a low expansion velocity of 15 km/s. The chemical abundances in the shell indicate that the progenitor had only undergone partial conversion of carbon into nitrogen when its life span came to an end. The morphology shows point symmetry around the center. Overall it is rectangular in shape, and has two pairs of higher density knots that are symmetric around the middle, aligned along position angles of approximately 30° and 163°. These display a slightly enhanced abundance of nitrogen compared to the rest of the nebula and are photoionized on the side facing the central star. The symmetrical shape of the nebula may have arisen from jets emerging from both sides of a disk about the central star.

== Gallery ==
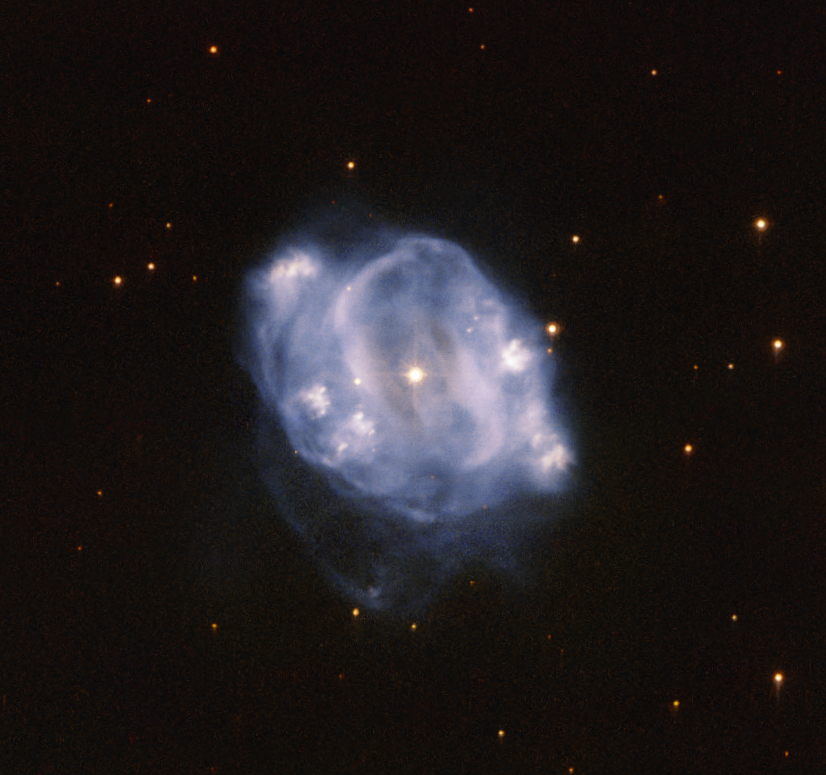
NGC 5307 can be seen primarily in the southern hemisphere.
