= PuWe 1 =

Planetary nebula in the constellation Lynx

Emission nebula
- Planetary nebula
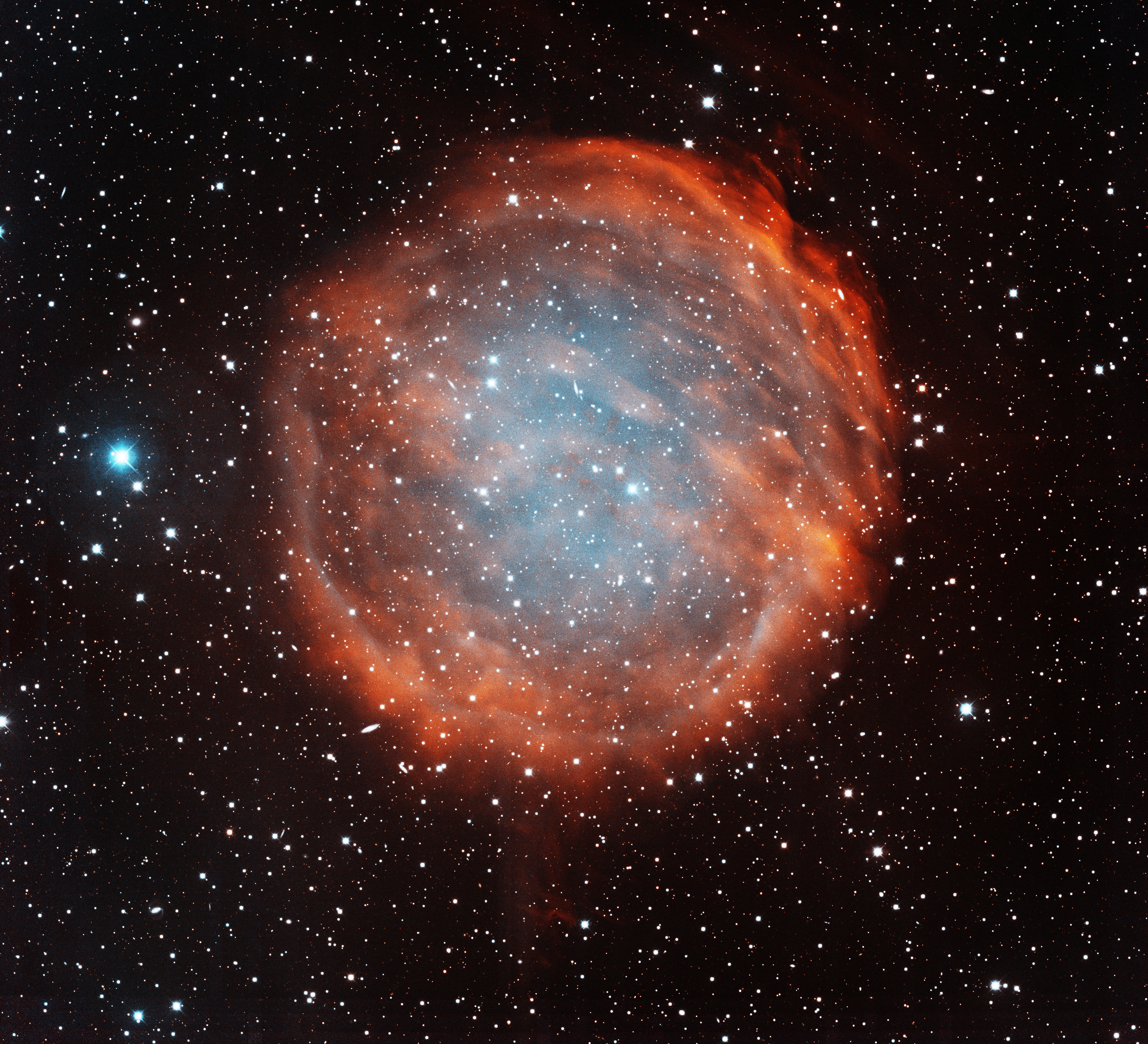
- PuWe 1 imaged by Nicholas U. Mayall Telescope

Observation data: J2000 epoch
- Right ascension: 06h 19m 33.94s
- Declination: +55° 36' 43.91"
- Distance: 1,300 ly
- Apparent magnitude (V): 15.545
- Constellation: Lynx
- Designations: PN G158.9+17.8, PK 158+17 1

PuWe 1 (Purgathofer-Weinberger 1) is a faint planetary nebula located approximately 1,300 light years away in the constellation Lynx, next to the border with Camelopardalis. It was discovered in 1980 by two Austrian astronomers Alois Purgathofer and Ronald Weinberger. The nebula has a magnitude of 11.2 and is about 20 arc minutes in diameter. The formation of the nebula began when a dying red giant star shed its outer layers.
