= Humason 2-1 =

Bipolar planetary nebula in the constellation Hercules

Hu 2-1
Emission nebula
- Planetary nebula
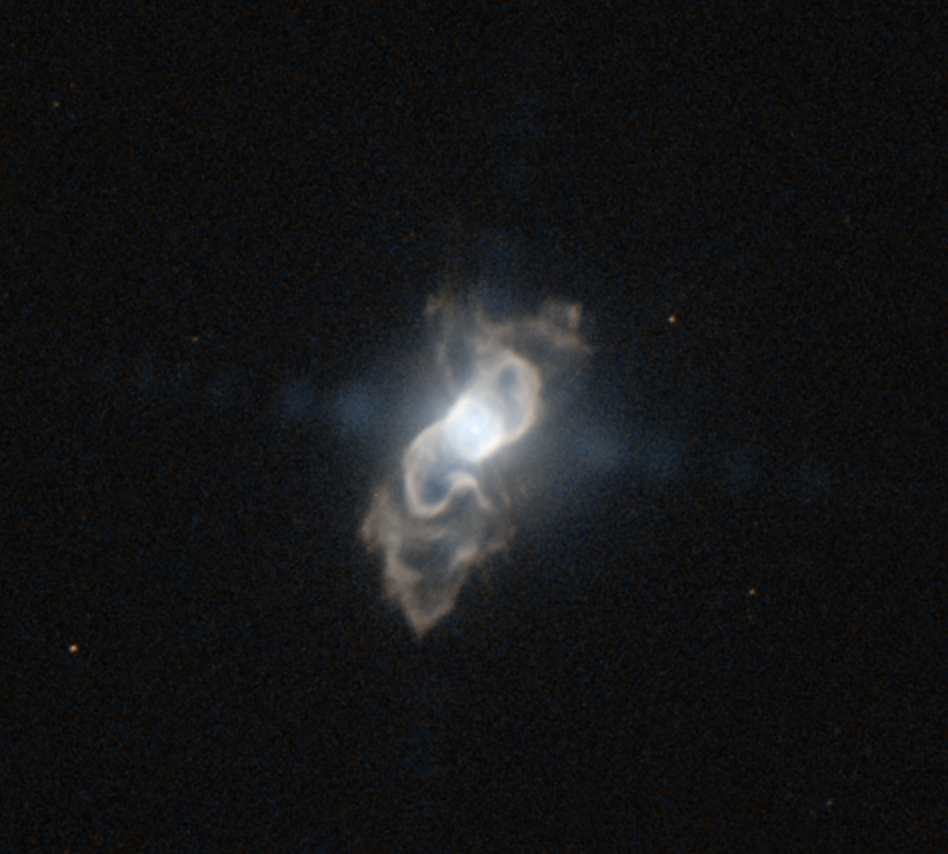
- Image of Hu 2-1 seen in narrowband filters F658N & F656N

Observation data: J2000 epoch
- Right ascension: 18^{h} 49^{m} 47.6^{s}
- Declination: 20° 50′ 39″
- Apparent diameter: ~3"
- Constellation: Hercules
- Designations: PN G051.4+09.6, PK 051+09 1

Humason 2-1 (Hu 2-1) is a bipolar planetary nebula with an elongated shape. This nebula has a radius of ~4.5 pc and was discovered by astronomer Milton Lassel Humason on June 23, 1992 at the Mount Wilson Observatory in California.

Humason 2-1 has a angular radius of ~0.4, which corresponds to a liner radius of ~4.5 10-3 pc if the distance of Hu 2-1 is 2.35 kpc.The expansion velocity of Hu 2-1 is approximately 10-15 km s⁻¹, this gave a electron density of ~10⁴ cm⁻³. Hu 2-1 has a rather high 5-GHz temperature of ~3455 K. The structure of Hu 2-1 is revealed by VLA radio continuum observations, which displays an elongated shape with a major axis oriented at position angle (PA) of ~320° and ~230°. A small ring close to the central star with a major axis of ~0.7" long and a PA of 135° was discovered.

== The central star ==
Central star of Hu 2-1 has a temperature of ~25-40 10³ K and a luminosity of ~11.5 10³ L_{☉}, placing it at the beginning of the PNe evolutionary track on the H–R diagram. The axisymmetric structure of Hu 2-1 is caused by the interaction of a binary companion with the primary stars envelope during the common envelope (CE) evolution. The moderate density between the equatorial and polar reigons indicate the progenitor star evolved to a late AGB stage before entering the CE phase.
