= HuBi 1 =

Faint planetary nebula in Serpens

Nebula
- Planetary Nebula

Observation data: J2000 epoch
- Right ascension: 17^{h} 54^{m} 21.13^{s}
- Declination: −15° 55′ 52.0″
- Distance: 22,440 ± 7,140 ly
- Apparent diameter: ~10"
- Constellation: Serpens
- Notable features: PNe with a outer shell and a inner shell.
- Designations: PN G012.2+04.9, PM 1-188, IRAS 17514−1555

HuBi 1 is a rare born-again planetary nebula discovered in 1990 by astronomers J. Y. Hu and E. A. Bibo. The nebula was discovered using data from the Nordic Optical Telescope, which is located at the Roque de los Muchachos Observatory on the island of La Palma in the Canary Islands. HuBi 1 has a heliocentric distance of 6.88 ± 2.19 kpc.

HuBi 1 possesses an outer shell emitting Hydrogen and Helium recombination lines, weak heavy-elements, and excited lines, these lines indicate that the outer shell is recombining. This outer shell has a radius of ~10" or ~15", this makes it the largest component. It is also the oldest structure and was ejected ~6,700 years ago, HuBi 1 is expanding at a velocity of 50 km s⁻¹.

The inner shell in HuBi 1 was discovered with emissions of intense excited lines such as N+, O+, and S+, this demonstrates an inverted ionization structure, this inverted ionization structure is caused by the C-rich population of stars at the center. The inner shell has a radius of ~3" and was ejected ~1,700 years ago. The expansion velocity of 40 km sec⁻¹. O III emission lines were discovered along the Northeast direction and uniquely defines the inner shell of HuBi 1, this emission has a ring-like appearance extending out to a radius of ~2."5. The O III emission has two distinct peaks along the west-east direction.

Obscured at the center of the nebula is a fast outflow or jet spanning ~2". It is the fastest kinematic component, traveling at 150 km s⁻¹ and has a possible maximum velocity of 250 km s⁻¹. It is also the youngest feature, having been ejected ~335 years ago.

== The central star ==
The central star has experienced born-again events, a process where, instead of evolving to a typical PN, it undergoes a very late thermal pulse. This event forces the stars evolutionary track to reverse, causing its outer atmosphere to expand and cool. After looping back in the H–R diagram by going through the AGB zone, the star enters the PN zone a second time. It has been proposed after returning to the PN stage the star becomes a Wolf–Rayet star and ejects a H-poor nebula. But the interaction with the older, H-rich old outer shell hindered the H-poor nature of the nebula. Alternatively, the system has been proposed to be a binary star system. The central star of HuBi 1 exhibits an unusually late, WC10 spectral type, corresponding to an effective temperature of ~35,000 K, which supports observations that the star has been fading significantly over the past 40–50 years.
