= NGC 6842 =

Planetary nebula in the constellation Cygnus

Nebula
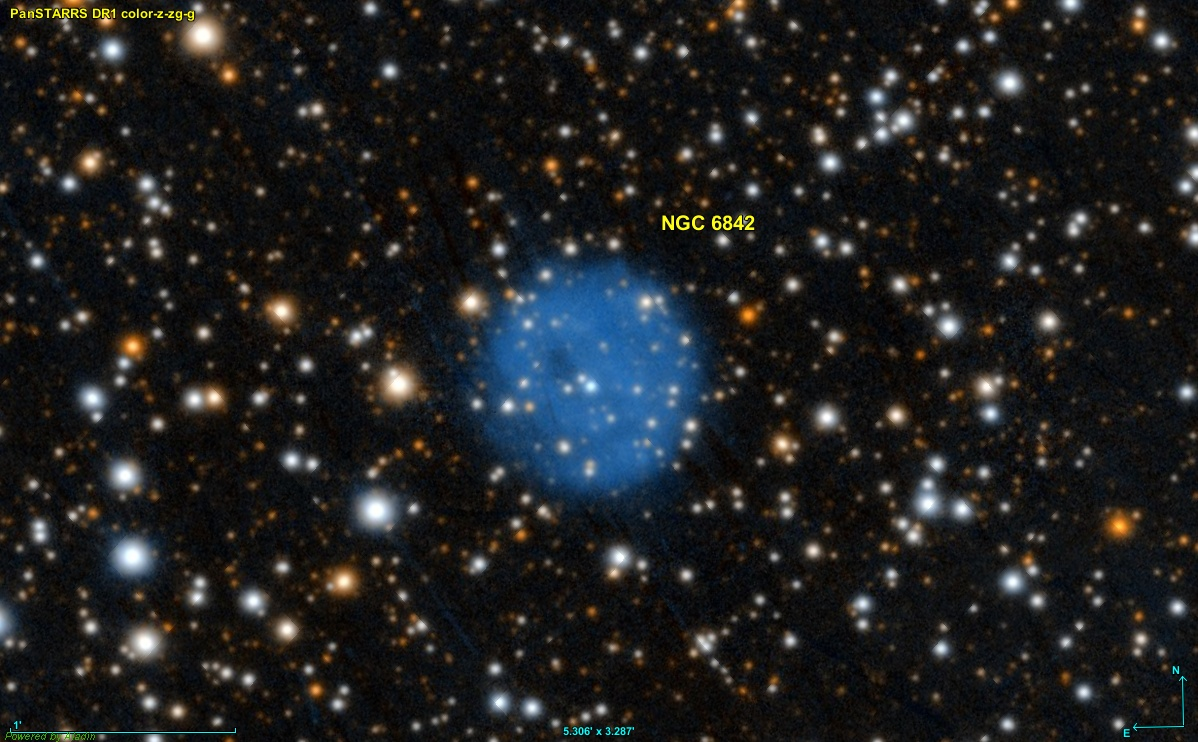

Observation data: epoch
- Right ascension: 19^{h} 55^{m} 02^{s}
- Declination: +29° 17′ 21″
- Distance: 4500 ly (1380 pc)
- Apparent magnitude (V): 13.2
- Apparent diameter: 1.13 ± 0.23
- Apparent dimensions (V): 50" x 45"
- Constellation: Cygnus

Physical characteristics
- Absolute magnitude (V): +2.62
- Designations: PN G065.9+00.5, Sh 2-95, VV 245

NGC 6842 is a planetary nebula in Cygnus, along the border with Vulpecula. It was independently discovered three times. First on 28 June 1863 by Albert Marth. Secondly, by Heinrich Louis d'Arrest on 26 August, 1864. Finally, on 26 August 1864 by Truman Henry Safford. It was later identified as a planetary nebula by Heber Doust Curtis in 1919.

The central star is magnitude 16.2
