= Hen 2-47 =

Planetary nebula in the constellation Carina

Emission nebula
- Planetary nebula
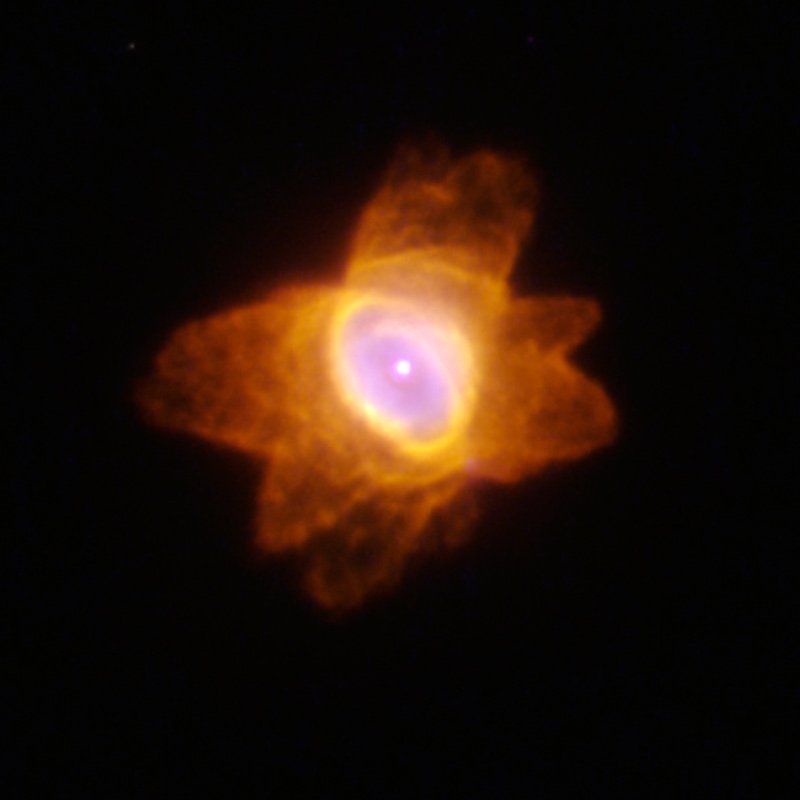
- Hen 2-47 photographed by the Hubble Space Telescope

Observation data: J2000 epoch
- Right ascension: 10^{h} 23^{m} 09.143^{s}
- Declination: −60° 32′ 42.21″
- Distance: 6600 ly
- Constellation: Carina
- Designations: ESO 127-16

Hen 2-47 is a young planetary nebula that lies about 6600 light years away from Earth in the southern constellation of Carina, the keel.

Hen 2-47 contains six lobes of gas and dust that suggest that the central star of the nebula ejected material at least three times in three different directions. During each ejection, the star fired off a narrow pair jets of gas pointed in opposite directions, eventually giving the nebula the shape it has at present.
