= Vy 1-2 =

Planetary nebula in the constellation Hercules

Emission nebula
- Planetary nebula
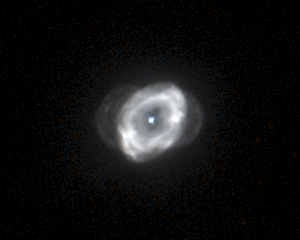
- Image from the NASA/ESA Hubble Space Telescope with color rendering done by aladin software.

Observation data: J2000 epoch
- Right ascension: 17^{h} 54^{m} 22.98^{s}
- Declination: +27° 59′ 58.1″
- Distance: 15,300-47,292 ly
- Constellation: Hercules
- Designations: PK 053+24 1, PN G053.3+24.0

Vy 1-2 is a planetary nebula discovered by Russian-American astronomer Alexander N. Vyssotsky in 1942.

== General information ==
Vy 1-2 contains a faint outer shell and two much fainter knots. The south knot is located 14.5 arcsec from the central star while the north knot is located 11.5 arcseconds form the central star. These knots has a radial expansion velocity of 90–100 km s⁻¹, and their kinematic age is 5200 ± 750 years. Vy 1-2 also has a bright-elliptical ring like structure with a minor axis of 2.4 arcseconds and a major axis of 3.2 arcseconds. The distance of Vy 2-1 remains uncertain, with estimates ranging from 7.0 to 14.5 kpc, The heliocentric radial velocity of the nebula is approximately -85 ± 4 km s⁻¹. Vy 1-2 has been a candidate for a halo PN because of its high systemic velocity (~500 pc) from the galactic plane.

The zanstra temperature of the He I line is 75.4 ± 10.2kK while the He II line is 99.8 ±4.3kK. The logarithmic Hβ flux is estimated to be -11.52 ± 0.01.

=== Central star ===
The central star is unknown, possibly a WR star or a strong and fast WEL nucleus, the detection of C II, C IV, and O III stellar lines supports the scenario. Anonther scenario used for a anomaly in BD +30° 3639" suggests the central star is a binary system.
