= NGC 6309 =

Planetary nebula in the constellation of Ophiuchus

Emission nebula
- Planetary nebula
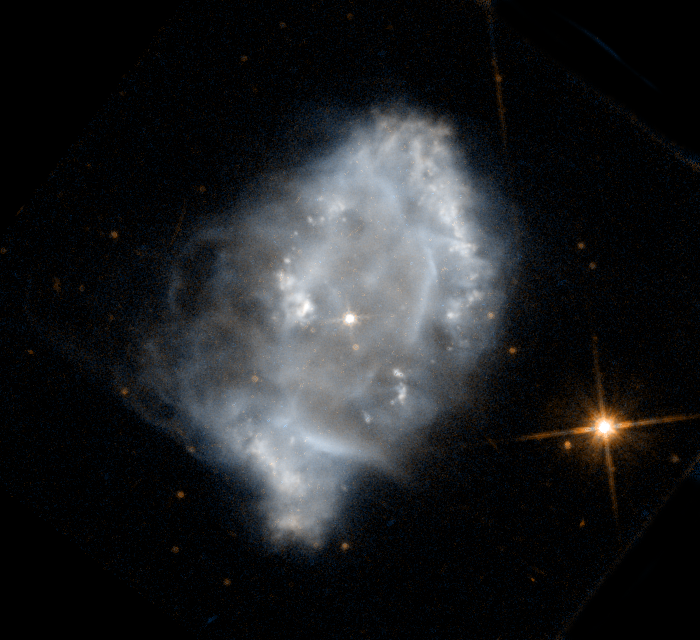
- NGC 6309 as seen through the Hubble Space Telescope

Observation data: J2000 epoch
- Right ascension: 17^{h} 14^{m} 04.3^{s}
- Declination: −12° 54′ 38″
- Apparent magnitude (V): 11.5
- Apparent dimensions (V): 0.32′
- Constellation: Ophiuchus
- Designations: PK 9+14.1, HD 155752, Box Nebula

NGC 6309, also known as the Exclamation Mark Nebula or Box Nebula, is a planetary nebula located in the constellation Ophiuchus. It was discovered by the German astronomer Wilhelm Tempel in 1876. It has a luminosity of about 1800 times that of the Sun. The distance to this nebula is not well known, but it is assumed to be about 6,500 light-years or 2,000 parsecs.

NGC 6309 is a quadrupolar nebula, with two pairs of lobes. Surrounding the pair is a spherical shell. The spherical shell formed before the four lobes. The square-like shape of the nebula gives it the nickname "Box Nebula".

The central star of the planetary nebula is an O-type star with a spectral type of O(He).

== See also ==
- List of NGC objects (6001–7000)
