= NGC 6072 =

Emission planetary nebula in the constellation Scorpius

Emission nebula
- Planetary nebula
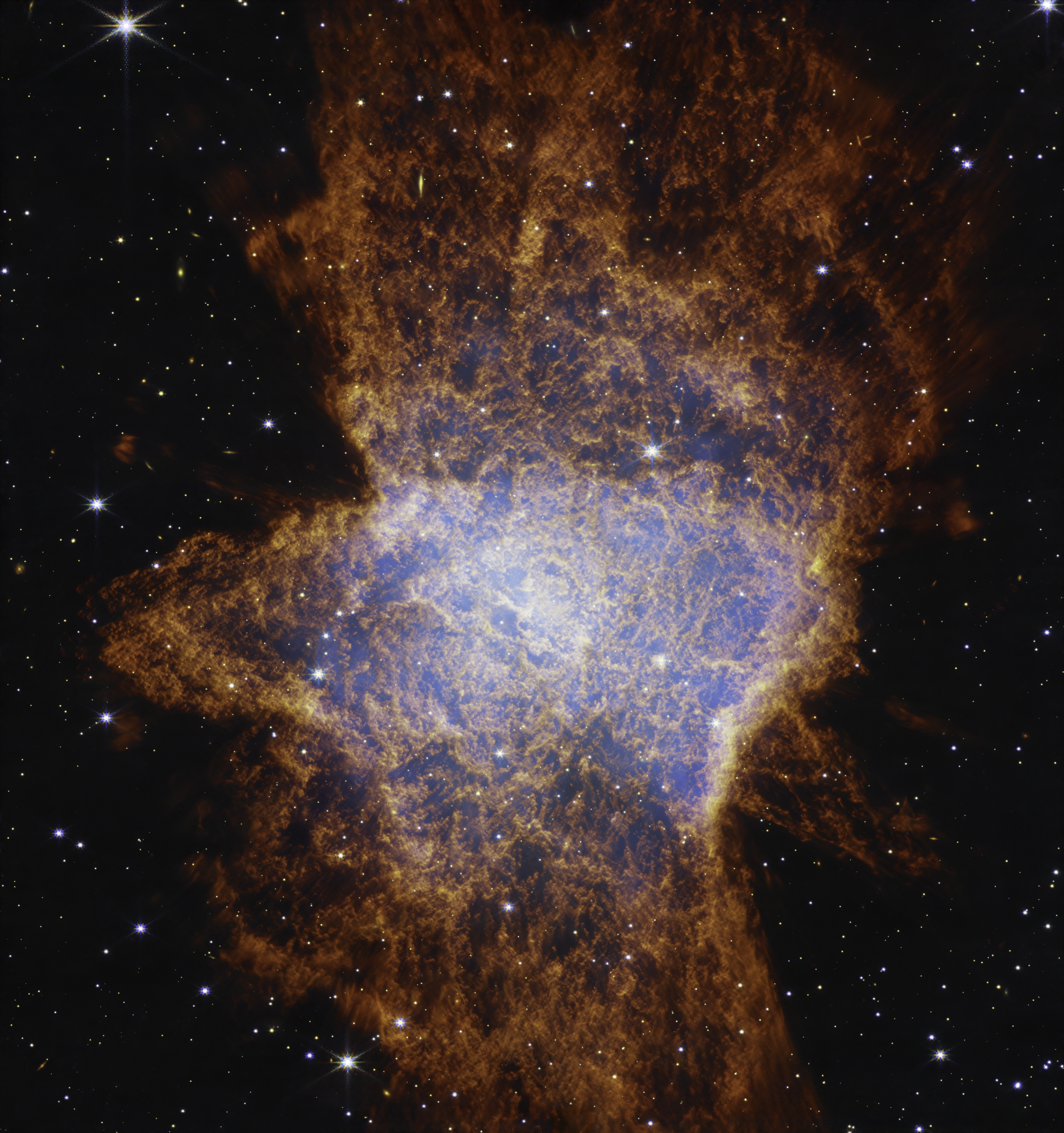
- NGC 6072 imaged by NIRCam on the James Webb Space Telescope

Observation data: J2000 epoch
- Right ascension: 16^{h} 12^{m} 58.363^{s}
- Declination: −36° 13′ 47.40″
- Distance: 3,060 ly (939 pc); 3,320 ly (1,017 pc) ly
- Apparent magnitude (V): 14
- Apparent dimensions (V): 70″
- Constellation: Scorpius
- Designations: PN Sa 2-134, SCM 107, ESO 389-PN 015, IRAS F16097-3606, 2MASX J16125713-3613263

NGC 6072 is a planetary nebula in the southern constellation of Scorpius. It has a dynamical age of 10^{4} years, and was discovered by British astronomer John Herschel on 7 June 1837.

NGC 6072 has a circumstellar envelope which is likely to be rich in carbon as it has very strong CN (cyanide) spectral lines. CN spectral lines are generally not detected in oxygen rich AGB (asymptotic giant branch) circumstellar envelopes. NGC 6072 also shows H_{2} (hydrogen) emission and intense CO (carbon monoxide) emission which has been mapped displaying bipolarity and some gas at high velocity. The evolution of this planetary nebulae is likely to be dominated by photodissociation and ion/radical molecular reactions. Shock chemistry is also likely to be important.

An analysis of Gaia data suggests that the central star is a binary system.

== Image gallery ==
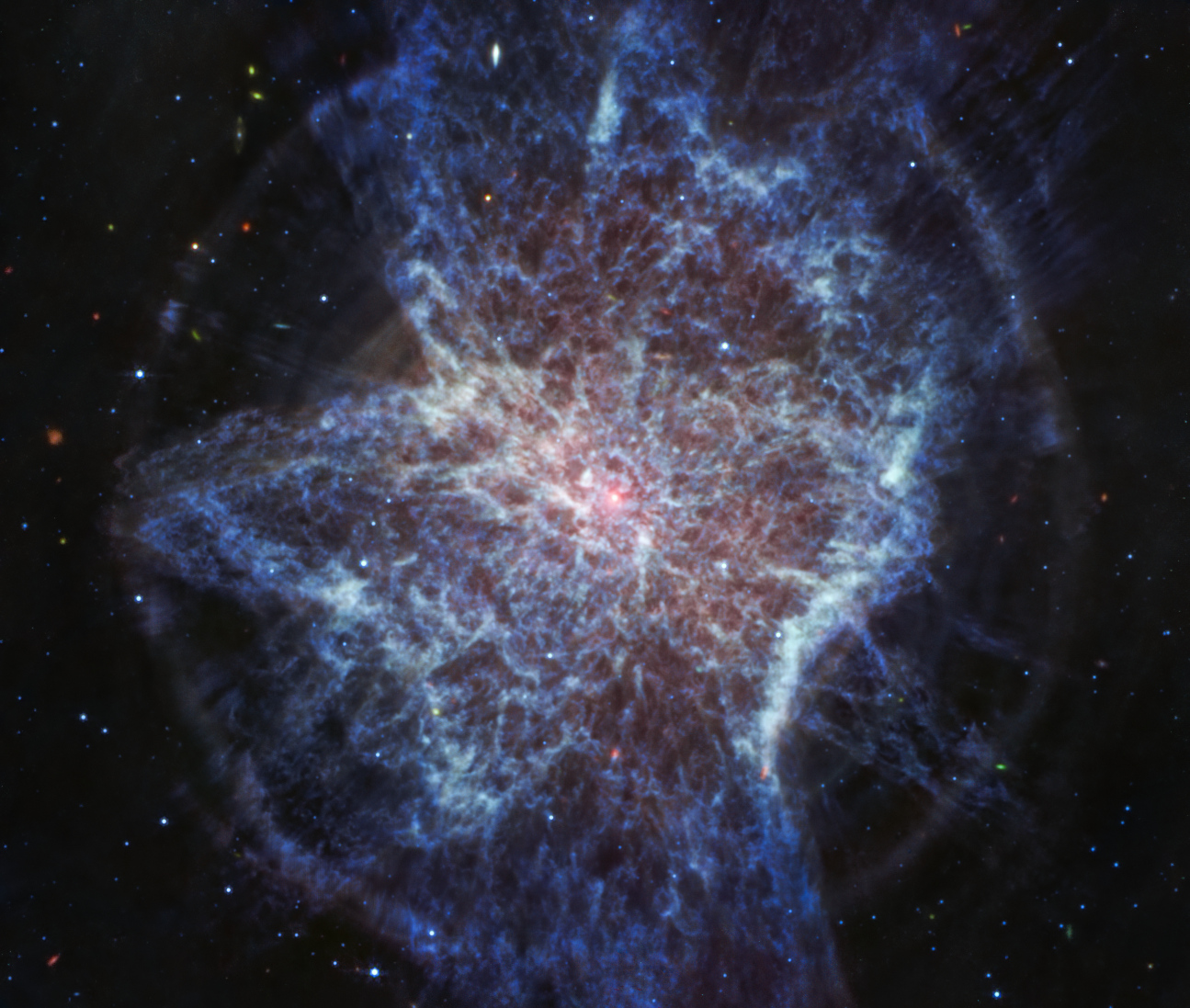
NGC 6072 imaged by MIRI on the James Webb Space Telescope

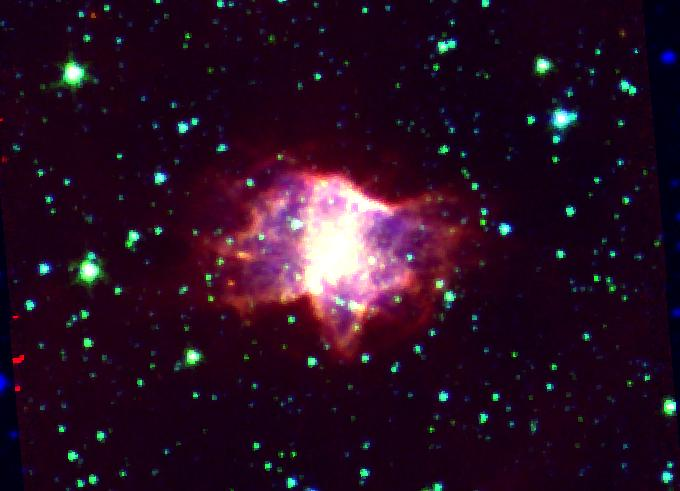
A Spitzer Space Telescope image of NGC 6072

== See also ==
- List of NGC objects (6001–7000)
