= Cyclocarbon =

Ring molecule composed entirely of carbon atoms

In organic chemistry, a cyclo[n]carbon (or simply cyclocarbon) is a chemical compound consisting solely of a number n of carbon atoms covalently linked in a ring. Since the compounds are composed only of carbon atoms, they are allotropes of carbon. Possible bonding patterns include all double bonds (a cyclic cumulene) or alternating single bonds and triple bonds (a cyclic polyyne).

The first cyclocarbon synthesized is cyclo[18]carbon (C_{18}). Besides that, C_{6}, C_{10}, C_{12}, C_{13}, C_{14}, C_{16}, C_{20}, and C_{26} are all known.

== Cyclo[3]carbon ==
The (hypothetical) three-carbon member of this family (C_{3}) is also called cyclopropatriene.

== Cyclo[6]carbon ==
The six-carbon member of this family (C_{6}) is also called benzotriyne.

== Cyclo[18]carbon ==
The smallest cyclo[n]carbon predicted to be relatively stable is C_{18}, with a computed strain energy of 72 kilocalories per mole. An IBM/Oxford team claimed to synthesize its molecules in solid state in 2019:

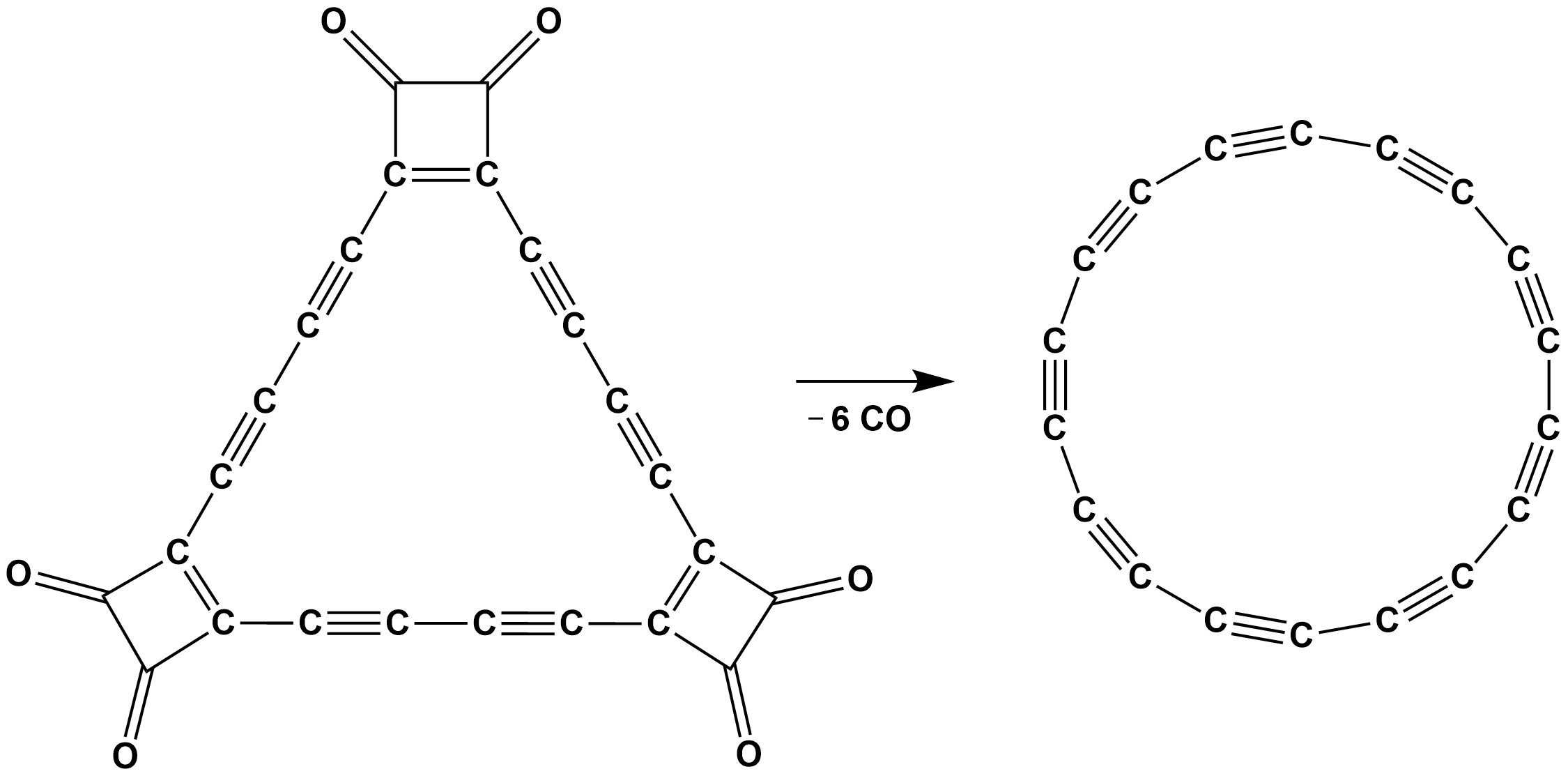
Synthesis of cyclocarbon

According to these IBM researchers, the synthesized cyclocarbon has alternating triple and single bonds, rather than being made of entirely of double bonds. This supposedly makes this molecule a semiconductor.

== Large cyclo[n]carbons ==
Larger cyclo[n]carbons, up to 100 carbon atoms, are predicted to exhibit polyradical character, like linear carbon chains. For all the cases investigated, n-atom linear and cyclic carbon chains (respectively l-CC[n] and c-CC[n]) are ground-state singlets, and energetically more stable as closed rings. The electronic properties of l-CC[n] and c-CC[n] display peculiar oscillation patterns for smaller values of n, followed by monotonic changes for larger values. For the smaller carbon chains, odd-numbered l-CC[n] are more stable than the adjacent even-numbered ones, and c-CC[4m+2]/c-CC[4m] (where m are positive integers) are respectively more/less stable than the adjacent odd-numbered ones. With the increase of n, l-CC[n] and c-CC[n] possess increasing polyradical nature in their ground states, with the active orbitals being delocalized over the entire length of l-CC[n] or the whole circumference of c-CC[n].

On the basis of TAO-LDA results, the smaller c-CC[n] (up to n = 22) possess nonradical nature and sizable singlet-triplet energy gaps (e.g., larger than 20 kcal/mol). In addition to the known c-CC[18], Seenithurai and Chai predicted that c-CC[10], c-CC[14], and c-CC[22] are likely to be synthesized in the near future.

c-CC[48] is not stable in solution at room temperature, but can be stabilized by threading it through bulky rings as a rotaxane.
