= Margaret Lindsay Huggins =

Irish-English astronomer (1848–1915)

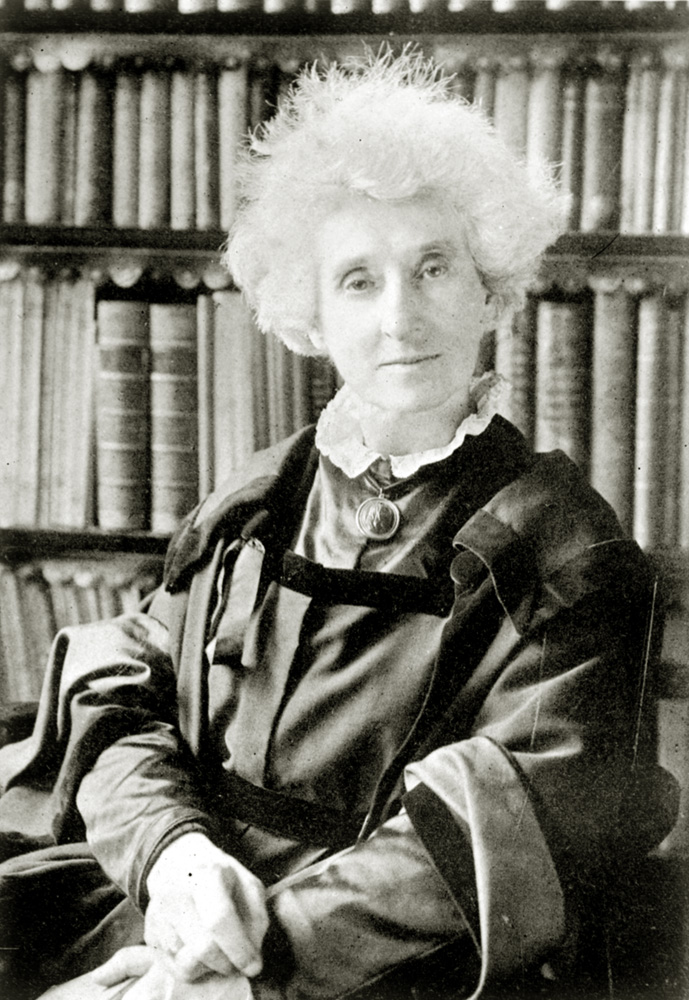
- Born: Margaret Lindsay Murray; 14 August 1848; Dublin, Ireland
- Died: 24 March 1915 (aged 66); London, England
- Spouse: William Huggins (m. 1875; died 1910)
- Scientific career
- Fields: Astronomy; Spectroscopy

Margaret Lindsay, Lady Huggins (née Murray; 14 August 1848 – 24 March 1915) was an Irish-English scientific investigator and astronomer. With her husband William Huggins she was a pioneer in the field of spectroscopy and co-wrote the Atlas of Representative Stellar Spectra (1897).

== Family and early life ==
Huggins was born on 14 August 1848, in Dublin, to a family of four. Her parents were Helen Lindsay and John Murray, a solicitor who attended Edinburgh Academy. Her younger brother by three years, Robert Douglas, attended Edinburgh Academy at the age of twelve, and then attended further education in Trinity College Dublin in his later years. The family home was a Georgian style townhouse, at 23 Longford Terrace in Monkstown, Dublin.

Margaret's grandfather, Robert Murray, was a very important figure in her life. He was a wealthy officer at the Bank of Ireland but also enjoyed the hobby of astronomy. From a young age Margaret had a keen interest in astronomy as a result of the relationship between herself and her grandfather. When she was a young girl her grandfather brought her outdoors in the evening, and taught her about all the constellations and how they can be identified. This inspired her to be an astronomer.

== Education ==
Margaret's early education took place privately at her home in Dublin, where she studied art, classics, literature, languages and music. She also spent some time at a school in Brighton, England. The exact location is unknown, but during this time period Brighton had at least two private boarding schools for girls, both later defunct.

Despite her successful career in astronomy, Mary received no formal training in this field. Instead, she studied popular astronomy books, including Sir John Herschel's Outlines of Astronomy. Margaret also developed a keen interest in photography, which she studied in her spare time; something which would later play a role in her career.

In 1873, during a continued effort to educate herself, Margaret read a copy of the 19th century publication Good Words. Although a religious pamphlet, it often published articles on general subjects, and science.

Here, she found a piece by the British Association for the Advancement of Science about recent work done by William Huggins on the spectroscope and constructed a spectroscope of her own after finding inspiration in that article.

Huggins' interest and abilities in spectroscopy led to her introduction by astronomical instrument maker Howard Grubb to the astronomer William Huggins, whom she married on 8 September 1875 in the parish church at Monkstown, Dublin. Evidence suggests that Margaret was instrumental in instigating William Huggins' successful program in photographic research. She was a contributor to the Encyclopædia Britannica Eleventh Edition.

== Marriage ==
Prior to their first encounter, Margaret was already a fervent admirer of her husband-to-be, Sir William Huggins. William was an astronomical spectroscopist, whose line of work collaborated instantly with Margaret's. Their partnership was described as being "one of the most successful husband and wife partnerships in the whole of astronomy".

After their marriage on 8 September 1875, at the Monkstown Parish Church, the "two star-gazed" lovers devoted themselves to their research and their inspiring companionship resulted in an array of astronomical findings. Margaret and William Huggins were the first to "observe and to identify the series of hydrogen lines in the spectrum of the star Vega". The pair's detailed notebook entries contributed to their first paper publication in 1889, discussing the "studies of the spectra of planets". They were also among those who "observed the Nova of 1892, Nova Aurigae". Margaret was specifically in charge of the visual observations, while together they collected "photographic spectra over several nights".

The couple's work had a major influence on their daily lives. Their home acted more as a work space, rather than a place for any kind of familial essence, and they never had any children. In 1903, Margaret and William Huggins published their final piece of joint scientific research on the spectra of certain radioactive substances.

== Career ==
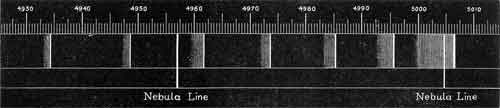
Spectrum of Orion Nebula by Huggins and Huggins

Margaret Huggins learnt the basic skills of photography early on in her life, and used these skills to assist her research at the Tulse Hill observatory. In 1875, Margaret and her husband William began photographic experiments, which were meticulously documented in observatory notebooks. Their early experiments photographed Sirius and Venus, and they used different techniques to capture them such as using wet and dry plates. Margaret made great improvements to their observatory equipment, and Margaret and William quickly rose to the forefront of spectroscopic astrophotography.

Margaret worked alongside her husband William at the Tulse Hill observatory. At first, she is documented to being an assistant, but after extensive research into their observatory notebooks, this has been disproven. She conducted many of her own research projects, and was a collaborative assistant to William. After 1875, Margaret and William began a meticulous program of photographic experiments. During the 1880s, the pair were devoted to two projects; the first attempting to photograph the solar corona, and the second examining different nebulae. The second project marked a milestone for Margaret, it was the first time she would be mentioned as the co-author of the paper alongside William. The Huggins' worked together for thirty-five years as equal collaborative investigative partners.

In 1890 she, and three other women, were elected to the council of the new British Astronomical Association; she later became an honorary member of the Royal Astronomical Society.

In 1906, when Hertha Ayrton was awarded the Hughes Medal by the Royal Society, Margaret Huggins wrote to congratulate her, "I lose not a moment in warmly congratulating you upon the award of the Hughes medal by the Royal Society... I deeply sympathise with the gratification you have the right to feel; and I truly rejoice in the encouragement and heartening which this success must be to you". This was the opposite view from her husband William, who had turned Ayrton down for Fellowship at the Royal Society a few years earlier and railed against the award of the medal to her.

== Death and legacy ==
After 30 years of devoting her life to science, Huggins felt that she had contributed the best of her work. William Huggins died in 1910. She planned to write the biography of her late husband, but never succeeded. Margaret fell ill and underwent various surgeries and spent some time in hospital.

Margaret Huggins died in London on 24 March 1915, at the age of 66. She was cremated and her ashes laid next to William's at Golders Green Crematorium.

The London Times, in the death notice for Huggins, mentioned that Richard Proctor referred to her as the "Herschel of the Spectroscope". In her will she bequeathed to Wellesley College and its Whitin Observatory some of her astronomy collection including cherished astronomical artefacts, reflecting her admiration for the achievements of American women in the academic world.

Margaret left instructions in her will for a memorial to be erected in St. Paul's Cathedral, London, in honour of her husband. This memorial consists of a pair of medallions which are inscribed "William Huggins, astronomer 1824–1910" and the other "Margaret Lindsay Huggins, 1848–1915, his wife and fellow worker". In 1997 a plaque was erected on the house she grew up in on 23 Longford Terrace, Monkstown Dublin.

== Publications ==
- Obituary, William Lassell, 1880.
- Astronomical Drawing, 1882.
- Obituary, Warren de la Rue, 1889.
- On a new group of lines in the photographic spectrum of Sirius, 1890.
- The System of the Stars, 1890.
- On Wolf and Rayet's Bright-Line Stars in Cygnus, 1891.
- The Astrolabe, 1895.
- The Astrolabe. II. History, 1895.
- Spectroscopic notes, 1897.
- An Atlas of Representative Stellar Spectra from λ 4870 to λ 3300, 1899.
- Obituary, Agnes Mary Clerke, 1907.
