= Tricarbon =

- Skeletal formula of tricarbon with all lone pairs shown

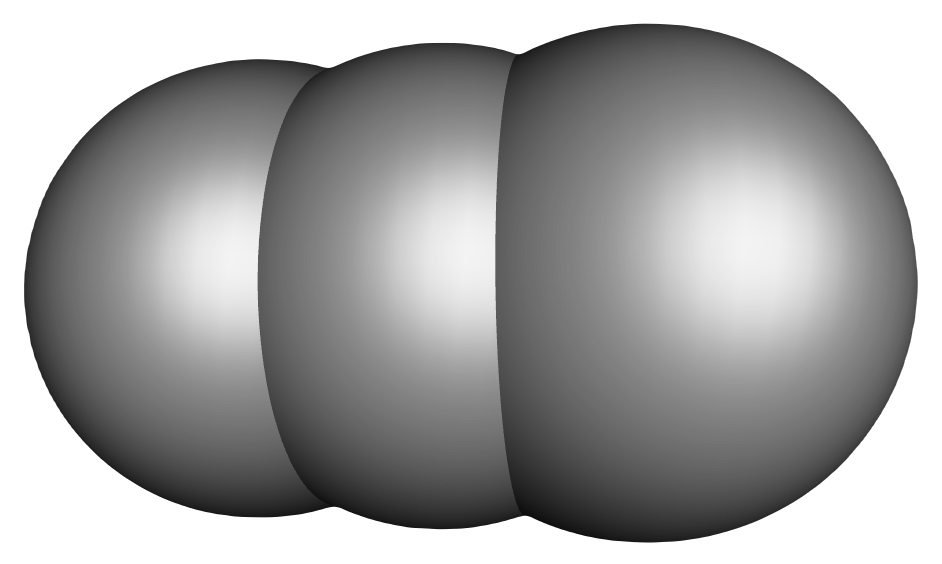

Names
- IUPAC name Tricarbon
- Systematic IUPAC name 1λ^{2},3λ^{2}-propadiene
- Other names Triatomic carbon

Identifiers
CAS Number	12075-35-3
3D model (JSmol)	Interactive image
ChemSpider	4937270
PubChem CID	6432003
CompTox Dashboard (EPA)	DTXSID801027035
- InChI: InChI=1S/C3/c1-3-2 Key: NVLRFXKSQQPKAD-UHFFFAOYSA-N
- SMILES: [C]=C=[C]

Properties
Chemical formula	C_{3}
Molar mass	36.033 g·mol^{−1}

Thermochemistry
Std molar entropy (S^{⦵}_{298})	237.27 J K^{−1} mol^{−1}
Std enthalpy of formation (Δ_{f}H^{⦵}_{298})	820.06 kJ mol^{−1}

Related compounds
Related carbon molecules	Diatomic carbon
- Except where otherwise noted, data are given for materials in their standard state (at 25 °C [77 °F], 100 kPa). Infobox references

Tricarbon (systematically named 1λ^{2},3λ^{2}-propadiene and catena-tricarbon) is an inorganic compound with the chemical formula C_{2}(μ-C) (also written [C(μ-C)C] or C_{3}). It is a colourless gas that only persists in dilution or solution as an adduct. It is one of the simplest unsaturated carbenes. Tricarbon can be found in interstellar space and can be produced in the laboratory by a process called laser ablation. It is the major constituent of carbon vapor between 2000 and 10000 K.

== Natural occurrence ==
Tricarbon is a small carbon cluster first spectroscopically observed in the early 20th century in the tail of a comet by William Huggins and subsequently identified in stellar atmospheres. Small carbon clusters like tricarbon and dicarbon are regarded as soot precursors and are implicated in the formation of certain industrial diamonds and in the formation of fullerenes.

C_{3} has also been identified as a transient species in various combustion reactions.

== Properties ==
=== Chemical properties ===
The chemical properties of C_{3} was investigated in the 1960s by Professor Emeritus Philip S. Skell of Pennsylvania State University, who showed that certain reactions of carbon vapor indicated its generation, such as the reaction with isobutylene to produce 1,1,1',1'-tetramethyl-bis-ethanoallene.

=== Physical properties ===
The ground state molecular geometry of tricarbon has been identified as linear via its characteristic symmetric and antisymmetric stretching and bending vibrational modes and bears bond lengths of 129 to 130 picometer corresponding to those of alkenes. The ionization potential is determined experimentally at 11 to 13.5 electronvolts. In contrast to the linear tricarbon molecule, the C^{+}_{3} cation is bent.

== Nomenclature ==
The systematic names 1λ^{2},3λ^{2}-propadiene, and μ-carbidodicarbon, valid IUPAC names, are constructed according to the substitutive and additive nomenclatures, respectively.

In appropriate contexts, tricarbon can be viewed as propadiene with four hydrogen atoms removed, or as propane with eight hydrogen atoms removed; and as such, propadienediylidene or propanetetraylidene, respectively, may be used as a context-specific systematic names, according to substitutive nomenclature. By default, these names pay no regard to the radicality of the tricarbon molecule. In even more specific context, these can also name the non-radical singlet state, whereas the diradical state is named propadienediylylidene, or propanediyldiylidene, and the tetraradical state is named propedienetetrayl or propanetetraylylidene.

== See also ==
- Hydrocarbons
- Alkenes
- List of molecules in interstellar space
- Cyclopropatriene
