= C18 =

C18 may refer to:

== Science and technology ==
- Caldwell 18 (NGC 185), a dwarf spheroidal galaxy of the Local Group in the constellation Cassiopeia
- Carbon-18 (C-18 or ^{18}C), an isotope of carbon
- C_{18}, the molecular formula of cyclo(18)carbon
- C18, an octadecyl-type hydrocarbon with 18 carbon atoms, such as
  - Fatty acids such as
    - Stearic acid, C_{18}H_{36}O_{2}
    - Oleic acid C_{18}H_{34}O_{2}
  - C18 bonded silica stationary phase column, a type of reversed-phase chromatography column
- IEC 60320 C18, a power connector
- Colorectal cancer (ICD-10 code)
- ISO/IEC 9899:2018 standard for the programming language C, informally named C18

== Transportation and military ==
- HMS C18, a submarine
- Sauber C18, a Formula One racing car
- Chrysler Royal C18, a 1938 car
- The C-18, a military cargo version of the Boeing C-137 Stratoliner

== Other uses ==
- French Defence (Encyclopaedia of Chess Openings code)
- Combat 18, a British neo-Nazi organisation
- 18th century (1701–1800 AD)
- Android 18, character from Dragon Ball Franchise
- Bill C-18, Canada's Online News Act
