= Timeline of knowledge about the interstellar and intergalactic medium =

Timeline of knowledge about the interstellar medium and intergalactic medium:

- 1848 – Lord Rosse studies M1 and names it the Crab Nebula. The telescope is much larger than the small refactors typical of this period and it also reveals the spiral nature of M51.
- 1864 – William Huggins studies the spectrum of the Cat's Eye Nebula and shows that it is a cloud of gas.
- 1904 – Interstellar calcium detected on spectrograph at Potsdam.
- 1909 – Slipher confirms Kapteyn's theory of interstellar gas.
- 1912 – Slipher confirms interstellar dust.
- 1927 – Ira Bowen explains unidentified spectral lines from space as forbidden transition lines.
- 1930 – Robert Trumpler discovers absorption by interstellar dust by comparing the angular sizes and brightnesses of globular clusters.
- 1944 – Hendrik van de Hulst predicts the 21 cm hyperfine line of neutral interstellar hydrogen.
- 1951 – Harold I. Ewen and Edward Purcell observe the 21 cm hyperfine line of neutral interstellar hydrogen.
- 1956 – Lyman Spitzer predicts coronal gas around the Milky Way.
- 1965 – James Gunn and Bruce Peterson use observations of the relatively low absorption of the blue component of the Lyman-alpha line from 3C9 to strongly constrain the density and ionization state of the intergalactic medium.
- 1969 – Lewis Snyder, David Buhl, Ben Zuckerman, and Patrick Palmer find interstellar formaldehyde.
- 1970
  - Arno Penzias and Robert Wilson find interstellar carbon monoxide.
  - George Carruthers observes molecular hydrogen in space.
- 1977 – Christopher McKee and Jeremiah Ostriker propose a three component theory of the interstellar medium.
- 1990 – Foreground "contamination" data from the COBE spacecraft provides the first all-sky map of the ISM in microwave bands.
