= Cyclo(18)carbon =

Ring molecule made of 18 linked carbon atoms

Cyclo[18]carbon
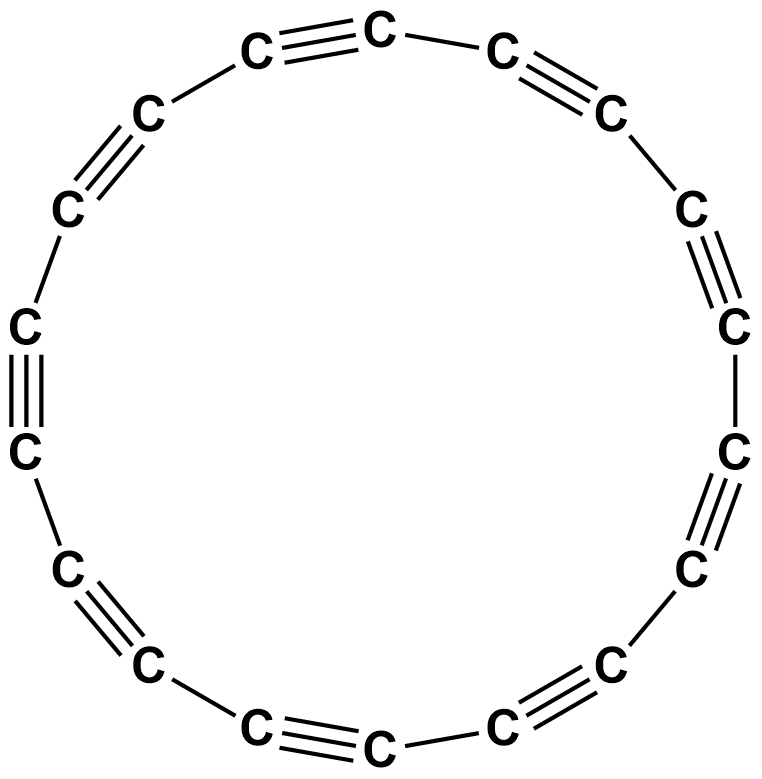

Names
- Preferred IUPAC name Cyclooctadeca-1,3,5,7,9,11,13,15,17-nonayne

Identifiers
| CAS Number | 126487-09-0 |
| 3D model (JSmol) | Interactive image |
| ChemSpider | 74015635 |
| PubChem CID | 14940714 |
| CompTox Dashboard (EPA) | DTXSID801267863 |
- InChI: InChI=1S/C18/c1-2-4-6-8-10-12-14-16-18-17-15-13-11-9-7-5-3-1 Key: GPWDPLKISXZVIE-UHFFFAOYSA-N
- SMILES: C1#CC#CC#CC#CC#CC#CC#CC#CC#C1

Properties
| Chemical formula | C_{18} |
| Molar mass | 216.198 g·mol^{−1} |
- Except where otherwise noted, data are given for materials in their standard state (at 25 °C [77 °F], 100 kPa). Infobox references

Cyclooctadeca-1,3,5,7,9,11,13,15,17-nonayne or cyclo[18]carbon is an allotrope of carbon with molecular formula C_{18}. The molecule is a ring of eighteen carbon atoms, connected by alternating triple and single bonds; thus, it is a polyyne and a cyclocarbon.

Cyclo[18]carbon is the smallest cyclo[n]carbon predicted to be relatively stable, with a computed strain energy of 72 kilocalories per mole.

It is, however, difficult to synthesize. It was first observed transiently in 1987 from a high-temperature retro-Diels-Alder reaction, but was unstable under those conditions, and could not be isolated.

A collaboration claimed to synthesize it in solid state in 2019 by electrochemical decarbonylation:

Synthesis of cyclocarbon

The observed geometry corresponds to alternating triple bonds and single bonds, rather than a cumulene-type structure of consecutive double bonds.

Cyclo[18] carbon is predicted to be a mild oxidant and a semiconductor.
