= Cyclo(6)carbon =

6-sided ring composed of pure carbon

Cyclo[6]carbon

Names
- Preferred IUPAC name Hexadehydrobenzene

Identifiers
CAS Number	21894-87-1
3D model (JSmol)	Alternating form: Interactive image; Cumulene form: Interactive image
ChemSpider	25934244
PubChem CID	12334440
CompTox Dashboard (EPA)	DTXSID70491042
- InChI: InChI=1S/C6/c1-2-4-6-5-3-1 Key: PXCDDPIOUAJVRE-UHFFFAOYSA-N
- SMILES: Alternating form: C1#CC#CC#C1; Cumulene form: C1=C=C=C=C=C=1

Properties
Chemical formula	C_{6}
Molar mass	72.066 g·mol^{−1}
- Except where otherwise noted, data are given for materials in their standard state (at 25 °C [77 °F], 100 kPa). verify (what is ?) Infobox references

Cyclo[6]carbon is an allotrope of carbon with molecular formula C_{6}. This theoretical molecule is a ring of six carbon atoms, connected by alternating double bonds. It is, therefore, a member of the cyclo[n]carbon family.

There have been a few attempts to synthesize cyclo[6]carbon, e.g. by pyrolysis of mellitic anhydride, but without success until 2023, when it was successfully synthesised by atom manipulation of hexachlorobenzene, although more thorough research has yet to be reported in peer-reviewed scientific work. Another synthesis was reported in 2025 by the dehalogenation of hexaiodobenzene on a sodium chloride layer on an Au(111) surface. The molecule's structure presents double bonds in sequence in a bent fashion, which is not explained by valence bond theory for organic molecules, that describes double bonds by combinations of hybridised sp^{2} orbitals, limiting the molecule's geometry in terms of increase of energy due to bond angles. Cyclo[6]carbon would present then low probability of formation due to its high energy state from a thermodynamical perspective, which is reflected on the lack of evidence of its successful synthesis.

Calculations suggest that the cyclic cumulene structure, called cyclohexahexaene, is the potential energy minimum of the cyclo[6]carbon framework, rather than a benzotriyne with alternating single and triple bonds.
