= Methylidenecarbene =

Names
- Systematic IUPAC name λ^{2}-ethene (substitutive) dihydrido-1κ^{2}H-dicarbon(C—C) (additive)

Identifiers
CAS Number	2143-69-3
3D model (JSmol)	Interactive image
PubChem CID	6432236
CompTox Dashboard (EPA)	DTXSID901046563
- InChI: InChI=1S/C2H2/c1-2/h1H2 Key: SNVLJLYUUXKWOJ-UHFFFAOYSA-N
- SMILES: [C]=C

Properties
Chemical formula	C_{2}H_{2}
Molar mass	26.038 g·mol^{−1}
Appearance	Colourless gas
Solubility in water	Hydrolyses
- Except where otherwise noted, data are given for materials in their standard state (at 25 °C [77 °F], 100 kPa). Infobox references

Methylidenecarbene (systematically named λ^{2}-ethene and dihydrido-1κ^{2}H-dicarbon(C—C)) is an organic compound with the chemical formula C=CH_{2} (also written [CCH_{2}] or C_{2}H_{2}). It is a metastable proton tautomer of acetylene, which only persists as an adduct. It is a colourless gas that phosphoresces in the far-infrared range. It is the simplest unsaturated carbene.

== Nomenclature ==
The systematic names λ^{2}-ethene, and dihydrido-1κ^{2}H-dicarbon(C—C), valid IUPAC names, are constructed according to the substitutive and additive nomenclatures, respectively.

In appropriate contexts, methylidenecarbene can be viewed as ethene with two hydrogen atoms removed, or as ethane with four hydrogens removed; and as such, ethen-1-ylidene (or vinylidene) or ethane-1-diylidene, respectively, may be used as a context-specific systematic names, according to substitutive nomenclature. By default, these names pay no regard to the radicality of the methylidenecarbene molecule. In even more specific context, these can also name the non-radical singlet ground state, whereas the diradical state is named ethene-1,1-diyl, or ethane-1,1-diylylidene, and the long-lived, tetraradical triplet state is named ethane-1,1,1,2-tetrayl.

Ethenylidene (without the -1- locant) or vinylidene, is used, systematically, to refer to the substituent group (=C=CH_{2}). It is used, non-systematically, to refer to substituent group ethene-1,1-diyl (>C=CH_{2}). Care should be taken to avoid confusing the names of the groups for the context-specific names for methylidenecarbene given above.

== Chemical properties ==
The 1λ^{2}-ethenediyl group (>C=C) in 1λ^{2}-alk-1-enes such as methylidenecarbene can accept or donate a pair of electrons by adduction. Because of this acceptance or donation of the electron pair, methylidenecarbene has Lewis-amphoteric character.

=== Structure ===
With a half-life on the order of hundreds of femtoseconds, free methylidenecarbene will spontaneously decay via tautomerisation to acetylene, with an energy barrier of between 4 and 21 kJ mol^{−1}. Besides tautomerisation, methylidenecarbene can also autopolymerise to form various oligomers, the simplest of which, is the cumulene butatriene. Calculations determine that the ground state of methylidenecarbene is a non-radical singlet state.

Although, free methylidenearbene is quickly destroyed by tautomerisation into acetylene, its adducts are quite stable. One such adduct ([Ru(Cl)_{2}(PCy_{3})_{2}(CCH_{2})]) is useful as a catalyst for the polymerisation of norbornene.

== Production ==
Most methylidenecarbene is produced in an adduct form by transition metal ethynation:

ML_{n} + HC≡CH → M(C=CH_{2})L_{n}

== See also ==
- Methylene (compound)
