= William Huggins =

British astronomer

Sir William Huggins OM KCB FRS
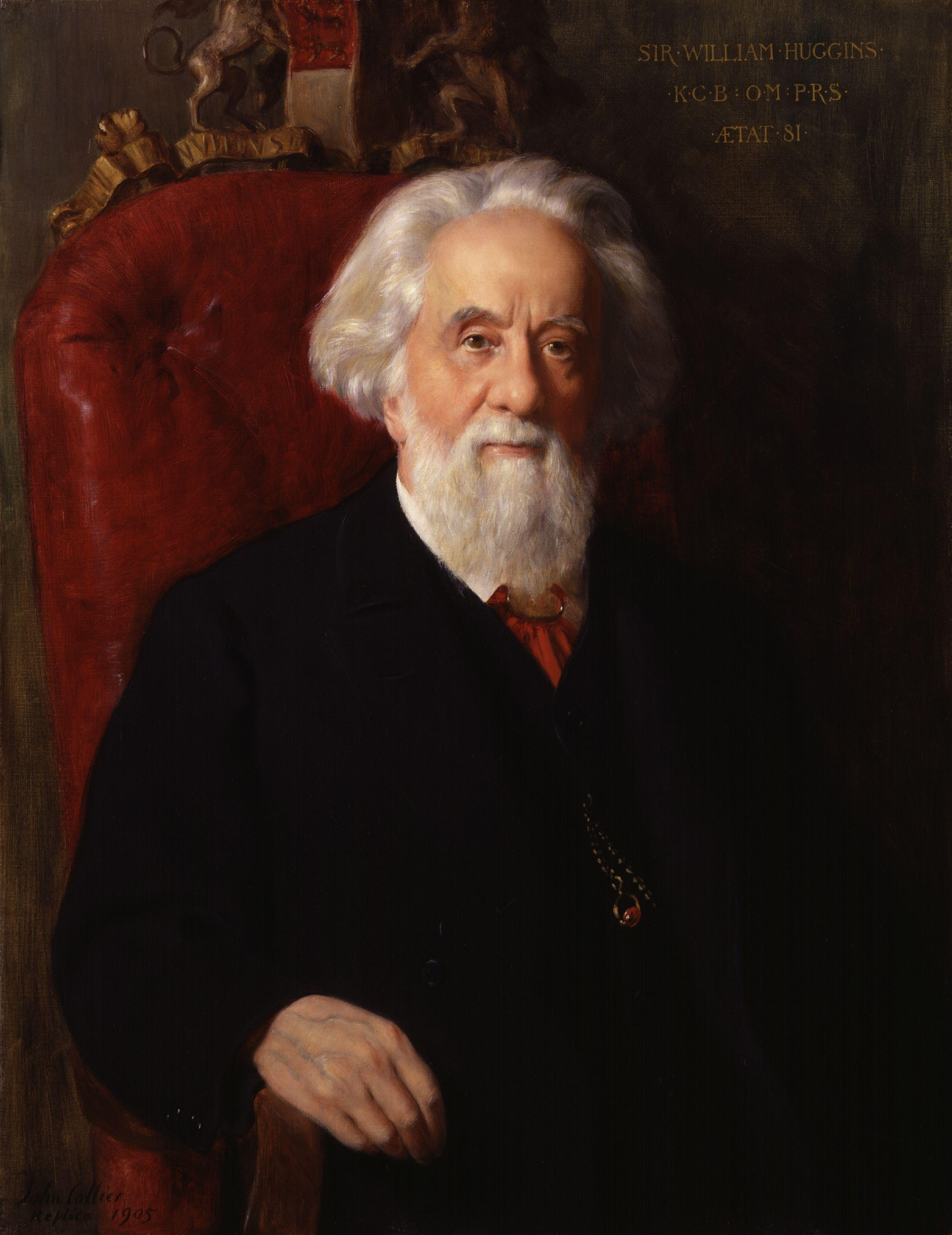
- Portrait by John Collier, 1905
- Born: 7 February 1824; Cornhill, Middlesex, England
- Died: 12 May 1910 (aged 86); Tulse Hill, London, England
- Known for: Astronomical spectroscopy
- Spouse: Margaret Lindsay Huggins
- Awards: Royal Medal (1866); Gold Medal of the Royal Astronomical Society (1867); Lalande Prize (1870); Rumford Medal (1880); Valz Prize (1882); Janssen Medal (1888); Copley Medal (1898); Actonian Prize (1900); Henry Draper Medal (1901); Bruce Medal (1904)
- Scientific career
- Fields: Astronomy

Sir William Huggins (7 February 1824 – 12 May 1910) was a British astronomer best known for his pioneering work in astronomical spectroscopy together with his wife, Margaret.

== Biography ==
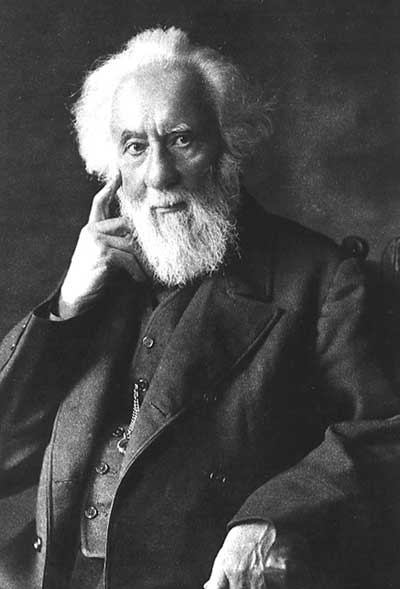
William Huggins (1910)

William Huggins was born at Cornhill, Middlesex, in 1824. In 1875, he married Margaret Lindsay, daughter of John Murray of Dublin, who also had an interest in astronomy and scientific research.

She encouraged her husband's photography and helped to put their research on a systematic footing.

Huggins built a private observatory at 90 Upper Tulse Hill, London, from where he and his wife carried out extensive observations of the spectral emission lines and absorption lines of various celestial objects.

On 29 August 1864, Huggins was the first to take the spectrum of a planetary nebula when he analysed NGC 6543.

He was also the first to distinguish between nebulae and galaxies by showing that some (like the Orion Nebula) had pure emission spectra characteristic of gas, while others like the Andromeda Galaxy had the spectral characteristics of stars.

Huggins was assisted in the analysis of spectra by his neighbour, the chemist William Allen Miller. Huggins was also the first to adopt dry plate photography in imaging astronomical objects.

With observations of Sirius showing a redshift in 1868, Huggins hypothesised that a radial velocity of the star could be computed.

Huggins won the Gold Medal of the Royal Astronomical Society in 1867, jointly with William Allen Miller. He later served as President of the Royal Astronomical Society from 1876 to 1878, and received the Gold Medal again (this time alone) in 1885. He served as an officer of the Royal Astronomical Society for a total of 37 years, more than any other person.

Huggins was elected a Fellow of the Royal Society in June 1865, was awarded their Royal Medal (1866), Rumford Medal (1880) and Copley Medal (1898) and delivered their Bakerian Lecture in 1885.

He then served as President of the Royal Society from 1900 to 1905. For example, his Presidential Address in 1904 praised the fallen Fellows and distributed the prizes of that year. He was opposed to the award of the Hughes Medal to Hertha Ayrton in 1906, concerned that the committee he chaired that refused her a Fellowship in 1902 would have their decision overturned. His wife Margaret wrote to Ayrton with warm congratulations on the award.

He died at his home in Tulse Hill, London, after an operation for a hernia in 1910 and was buried at Golders Green Crematorium.

== Telescopes ==
In 1856 Huggins acquired a 5-inch diameter aperture telescope by Dollond. In 1858 an 8-inch telescope by Clark was added. These were both refracting telescopes. They had glass objectives.

In 1871 Huggins acquired an 18-inch (0.46 m) speculum reflecting telescope from the Grubb Telescope Company.

== Honours and awards ==
Honours

- Elected to honorary membership of the Manchester Literary and Philosophical Society in 1869.
- Elected an International Honorary Member of the American Academy of Arts and Sciences in 1892.
- Elected an International Member of the American Philosophical Society in 1895.
- Knight Commander of the Order of the Bath (KCB) in the 1897 Diamond Jubilee Honours list on 22 June 1897.
- Huggins was among the original recipients of the Order of Merit (OM) in the 1902 Coronation Honours list published on 26 June 1902, and received the order from King Edward VII at Buckingham Palace on 8 August 1902.
- Elected an International Member of the United States National Academy of Sciences in 1904.

Awards

- Royal Medal (1866)
- Lalande Prize (1870)
- Gold Medal of the Royal Astronomical Society (jointly with William Allen Miller in 1867, solo in 1885)
- Rumford Medal (1880)
- Valz Prize (1882)
- Member of the Royal Swedish Academy of Sciences (1883)
- Janssen Medal (1888)
- Copley Medal (1898)
- Henry Draper Medal from the National Academy of Sciences (1901)
- Bruce Medal (1904)

Named after him

- Huggins (lunar crater)
- Huggins (Martian crater)
- Asteroid 2635 Huggins

== Publications ==
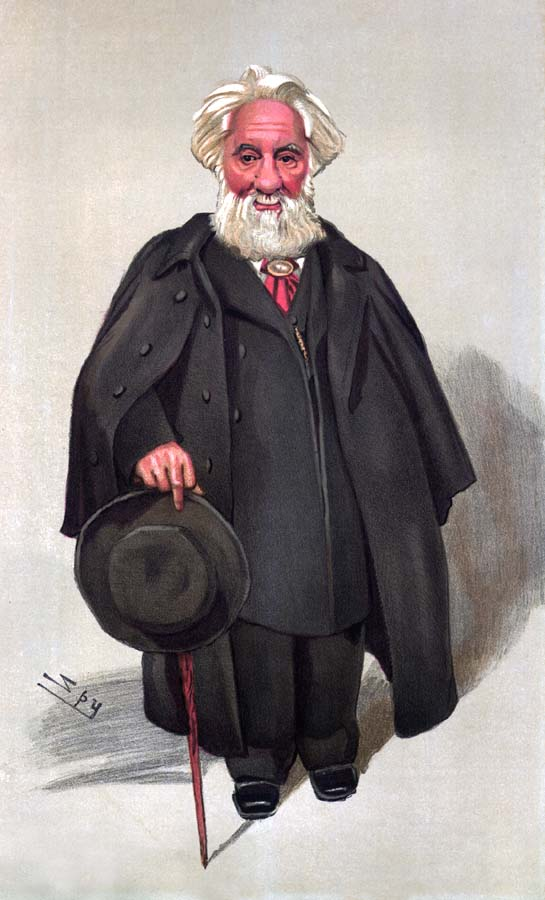
Caricature of Huggins by Leslie Ward in Vanity Fair

- 1870: Spectrum analysis in its application to the heavenly bodies. Manchester, (Science lectures for the work

people; series 2, no. 3)

- 1872: (editor) Spectrum analysis in its application to terrestrial substances and the physical constitution of heavenly bodies by H. Schellen, translated by Jane and Caroline Lassell, link from HathiTrust.
- 1899: (with Lady Huggins): An Atlas of Representative Stellar Spectra from $\lambda$4870 to $\lambda$3300, together with a discussion of the evolution order of the stars, and the interpretation of their spectra; preceded by a short history of the observatory. London, (Publications of Sir William Huggins's Observatory; v. 1)
- 1906: The Royal Society, or, Science in the state and in the schools. London.
- 1909: The Scientific Papers of Sir William Huggins; edited by Sir William and Lady Huggins. London, (Publications of Sir William Huggins's Observatory; v. 2)

== See also ==
- Planetary nebula#Observations
- Timeline of knowledge about the interstellar and intergalactic medium
- List of presidents of the Royal Society

Professional and academic associations
| Preceded by Joseph Lister | 38th President of the Royal Society; 1900–1905 | Succeeded by Lord Rayleigh |
