= Cyclopropatriene =

Hypothetical compound; 3-sided ring of double-bound carbon atoms

- Skeletal formula of cyclopropatriene

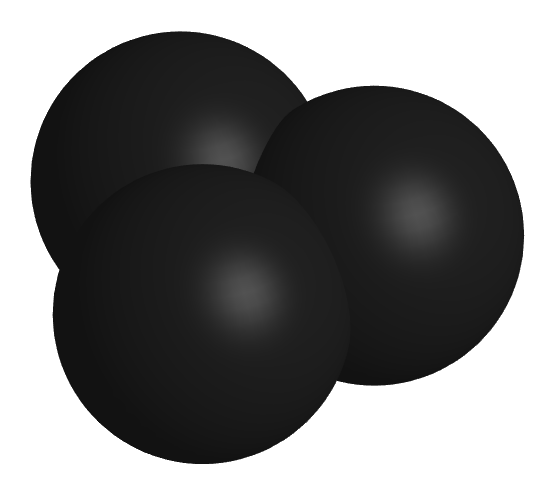

Names
- Preferred IUPAC name Cyclopropa-1,1(3),2-triene

Identifiers
3D model (JSmol)	Interactive image
PubChem CID	57449547
CompTox Dashboard (EPA)	DTXSID801336161
- InChI: InChI=1S/C3/c1-2-3-1 Key: YFIWEVIZVZPDMO-UHFFFAOYSA-N
- SMILES: C=1=C=C=1

Properties
Chemical formula	C_{3}
Molar mass	36.033 g·mol^{−1}
- Except where otherwise noted, data are given for materials in their standard state (at 25 °C [77 °F], 100 kPa). Infobox references

Cyclopropatriene is a hypothetical compound (C_{3}) which is an allotrope of carbon. It was once proposed as a candidate for a spectroscopically observed tricarbon species. It is a cyclic cumulene.
