= Cumulene =

Hydrocarbon compound with 3 or more consecutive double bonds

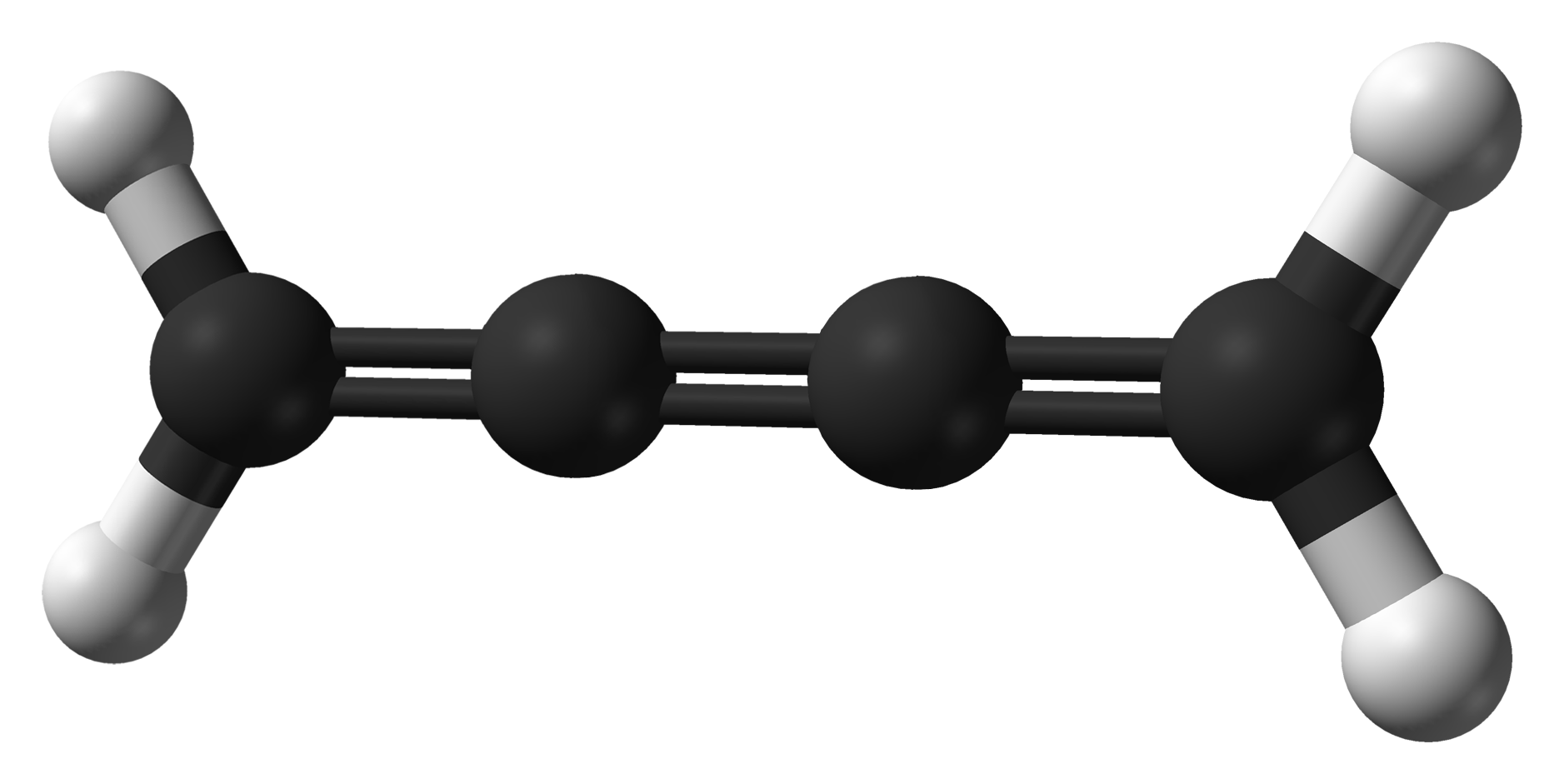
Butatriene, the simplest cumulene

A cumulene is a compound having three or more cumulative (consecutive) double bonds. They are analogous to allenes, such as propadiene, but with at least one additional alkene unit. The simplest molecule in this class is thus butatriene (H_{2}C=C=C=CH_{2}), which is also called simply cumulene. Unlike most alkanes and alkenes, cumulenes tend to be rigid, comparable to polyynes. Cumulene carbenes H_{2}C_{n} for n from 3 to 6 have been observed in interstellar molecular clouds and in laboratory experiments by using microwave and infrared spectroscopy. (The more stable cumulenes H_{2}C_{n}H_{2} are difficult to detect optically because they lack an electric dipole moment.) Cumulenes containing heteroatoms are called heterocumulenes; an example is carbon suboxide.

== Synthesis ==
The first reported synthesis of a butatriene is that of tetraphenylbutatriene in 1921. The most common synthetic method for butatriene synthesis is based on reductive coupling of a geminal dihalovinylidene. Tetraphenylbutatriene was reported synthesized in 1977 by homocoupling of 2,2-diphenyl-1,1,1-tribromoethane with elemental copper in dimethylformamide.

== Structure ==
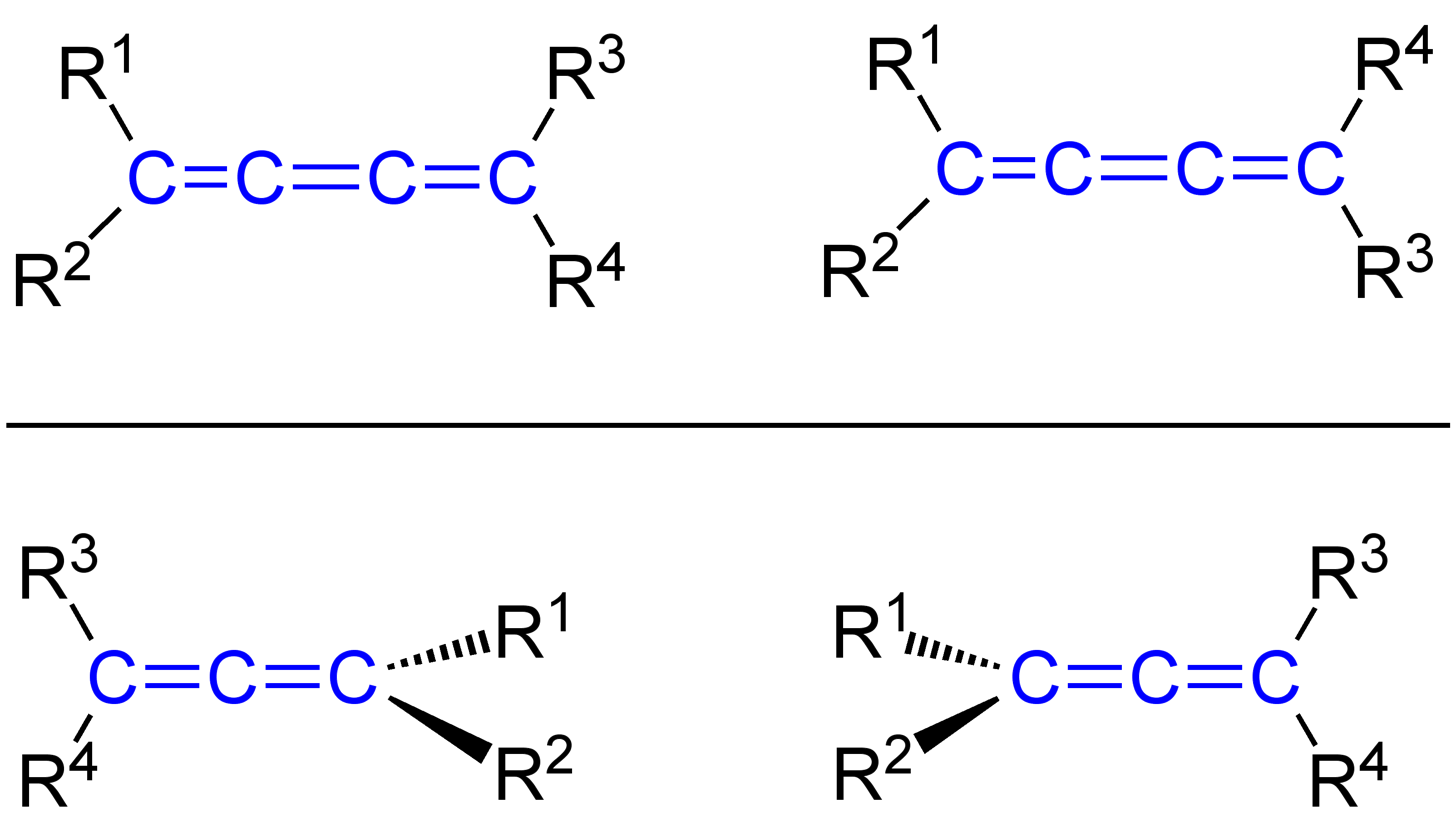
Cis–trans isomerism of a triene vs axial chirality of an allene

The rigidity of cumulenes arises from the fact that the internal carbon atoms carry double bonds. Their sp hybridisation results in two π bonds, one to each neighbor, which are perpendicular to each other. This bonding reinforces a linear geometry of the carbon chain.

Cumulenes with non-equivalent substituents on each end exhibit isomerism. If the number of consecutive double bonds is odd, there is cis–trans isomerism as for alkenes. If the number of consecutive double bonds is even, there is axial chirality as for allenes.

== Transition metal heterocumulenes ==
The first reported complex containing a vinylidene ligand was (Ph_{2}C_{2}Fe_{2}(CO)_{8}, derived from the reaction of diphenylketene and Fe(CO)_{5}. Structurally, this molecule resembles Fe_{2}(CO)_{9}, wherein one μ-CO ligand is replaced by 1,1-diphenylvinylidene, Ph_{2}C_{2}. The first monometallic vinylidene complex was (C_{5}H_{5})Mo(P(C_{6}H_{5})_{3})(CO)_{2}[C=C(CN)_{2}]Cl.

== See also ==
- Cyclopropatriene and cyclohexahexaene, cyclic cumulenes
