= Cat's Eye Nebula =

Planetary nebula in the constellation Draco

Emission nebula
- Planetary nebula
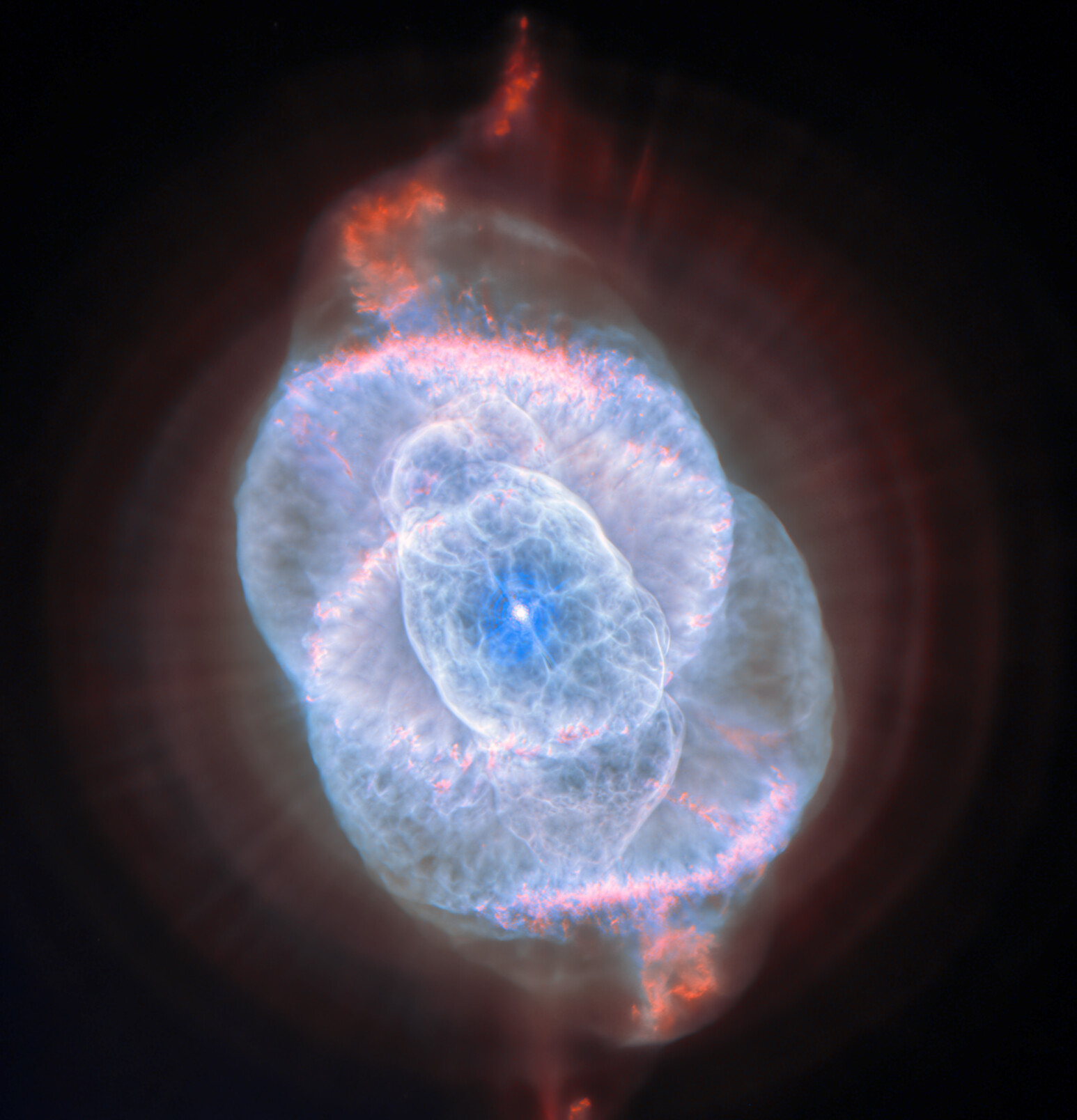
- Hubble Space Telescope image of Cat's Eye Nebula

Observation data: J2000 epoch
- Right ascension: 17^{h} 58^{m} 33.423^{s}
- Declination: +66° 37′ 59.52″
- Distance: 3.3±0.9 kly (1.0±0.3 kpc) ly
- Apparent magnitude (V): 9.8B
- Apparent dimensions (V): Core: 20″
- Constellation: Draco

Physical characteristics
- Radius: Core: 0.2 ly (Note: Distance × sin(diameter_angle / 2 ) = 0.2 ly. radius) ly
- Absolute magnitude (V): −0.2+0.8 −0.6B (Note: 9.8B apparent magnitude – 5×{log(1.0 ± 0.3 kpc distance) − 1} = −0.2+0.8 −0.6B absolute magnitude)
- Notable features: complex structure
- Designations: NGC 6543, Snail Nebula, Sunflower Nebula, (includes IC 4677), Caldwell 6

The Cat's Eye Nebula (also known as NGC 6543 and Caldwell 6) is a planetary nebula in the northern constellation of Draco, discovered by William Herschel on February 15, 1786. It was the first planetary nebula whose spectrum was investigated by the English amateur astronomer William Huggins, demonstrating that planetary nebulae were gaseous and not stellar in nature. Structurally, the object has had high-resolution images by the Hubble Space Telescope revealing knots, jets, bubbles and complex arcs, being illuminated by the central hot planetary nebula nucleus (PNN). It is a well-studied object that has been observed from radio to X-ray wavelengths. At the centre of the Cat's Eye Nebula is a dying Wolf–Rayet star, the sort of which can be seen in the Webb Telescope's image of WR 124. The Cat's Eye Nebula's central star shines at magnitude +11.4. Hubble Space Telescope images show a sort of dart board pattern of concentric rings emanating outwards from the centre.

== General information ==
NGC 6543 is a high northern declination deep-sky object. It has the combined magnitude of 8.1, with high surface brightness. Its small bright inner nebula subtends an average of 16.1 arcsec, with the outer prominent condensations about 25 arcsec. Deep images reveal an extended halo about 300 arcsec or 5 arcminutes across, that was once ejected by the central progenitor star during its red giant phase.

NGC 6543 is 4.4 minutes of arc from the current position of the north ecliptic pole, less than 1/10 of the 45 arcminutes between Polaris and the current location of the Earth's northern axis of rotation. It is a convenient and accurate marker for the axis of rotation of the Earth's ecliptic, around which the celestial North Pole rotates. It is also a good marker for the nearby "invariable" axis of the Solar System, which is the center of the circles which every planet's north pole, and the north pole of every planet's orbit, make in the sky. Since motion in the sky of the ecliptic pole is very slow compared to the motion of the Earth's north pole, its position as an ecliptic pole station marker is essentially permanent on the timescale of human history, as opposed to the pole star, which changes every few thousand years.

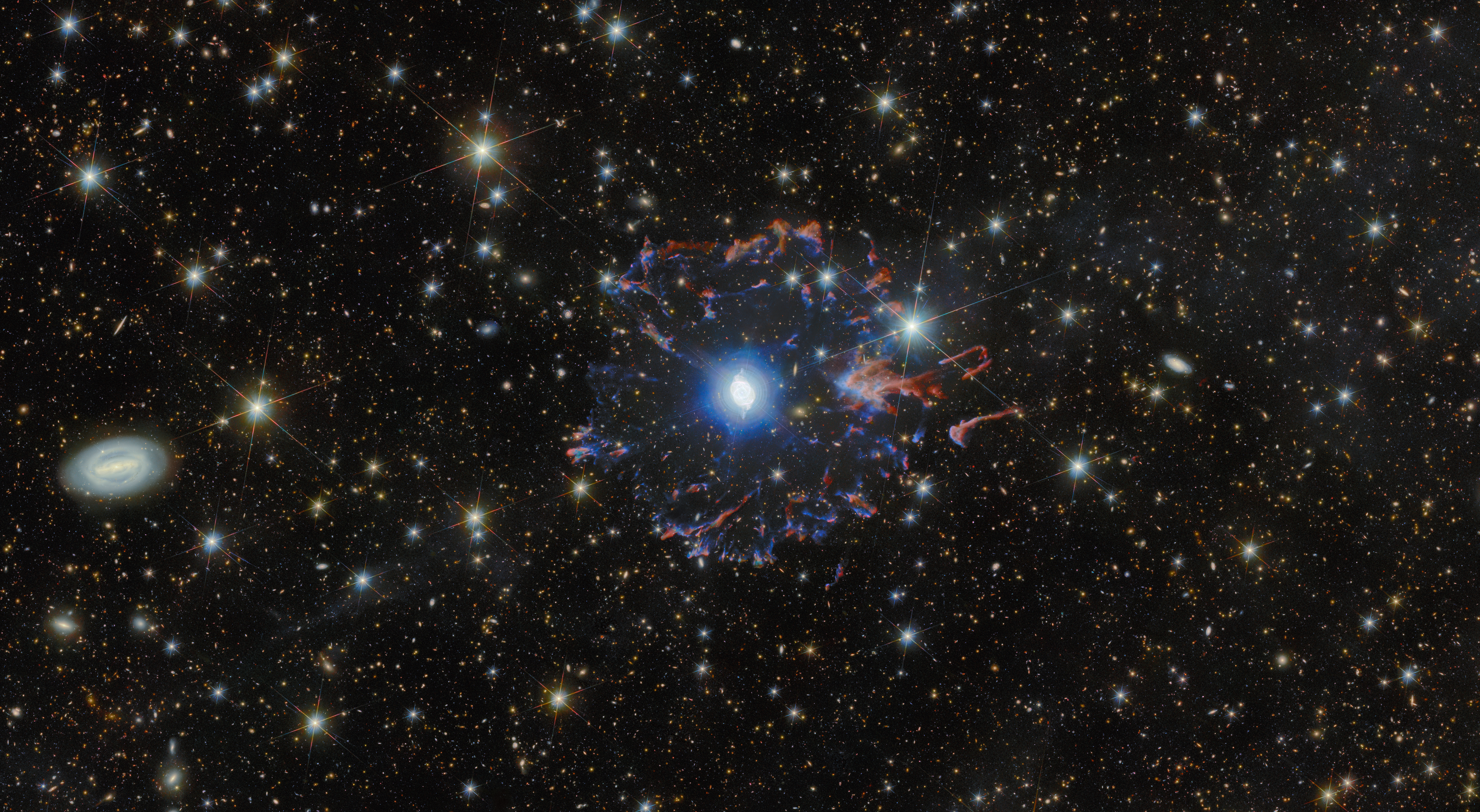
Cat's Eye Nebula imaged by Euclid and the Hubble Space Telescope

Observations show the bright nebulosity has temperatures between 7000 and 9000 K, whose densities average of about 5000 particles per cubic centimetre. Its outer halo has the higher temperature around 15,000 K, but is of much lower density. Velocity of the fast stellar wind is about 1900 km/s, where spectroscopic analysis shows the current rate of mass loss averages 3.2×10^{−7} solar masses per year, equivalent to twenty trillion tons per second (20 Eg/s).

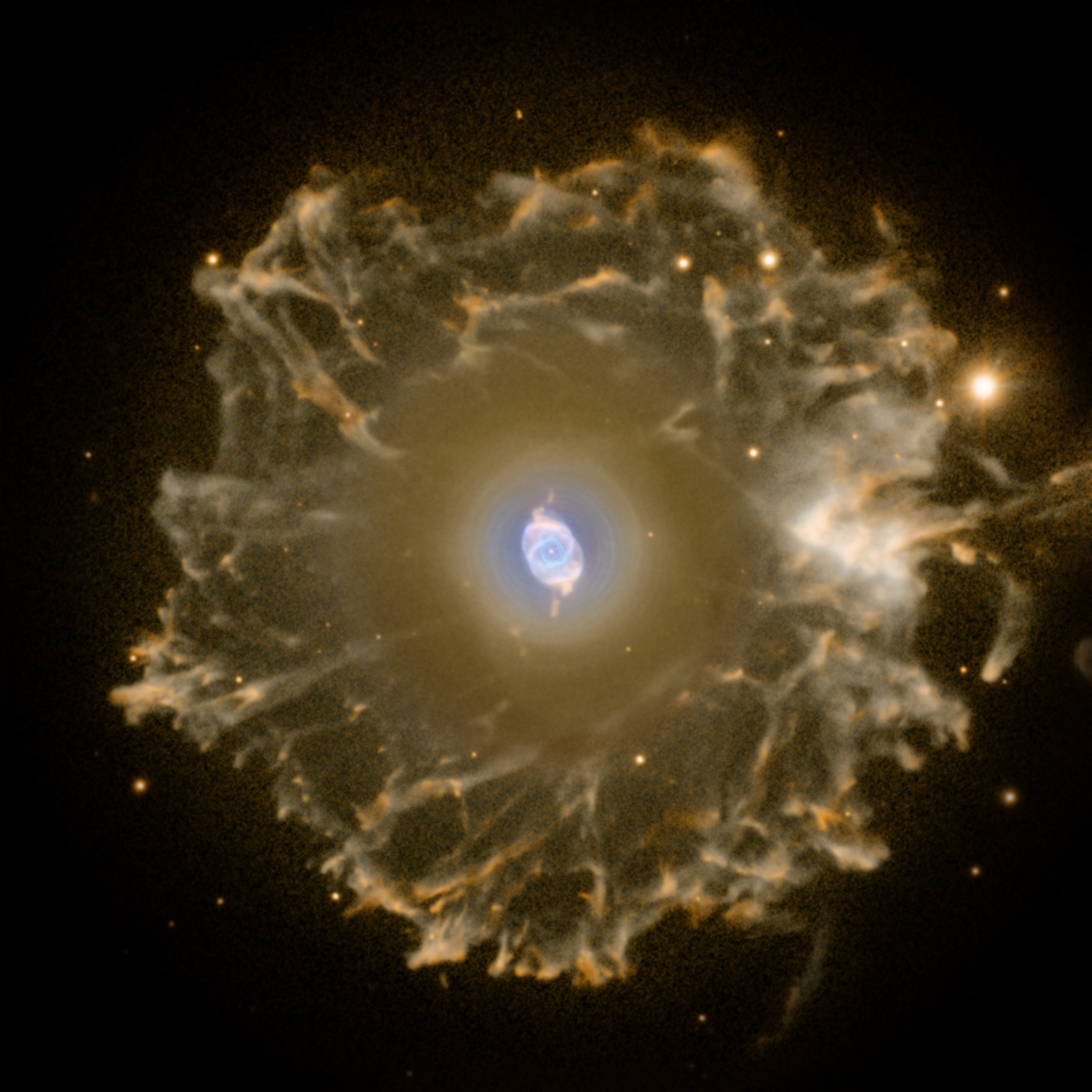
An optical image of the nebula's surrounding halo

Surface temperature for the central PNN is about 80,000 K, being 10,000 times as luminous as the sun. Stellar classification is O7 + [WR]-type star. Calculations suggest the PNN is over one solar mass, from a theoretical initial 5 solar masses. The central Wolf–Rayet star has a radius of 0.65 R_{☉} (452,000 km). The Cat's Eye Nebula, given in some sources, lies about three thousand light-years from Earth.

== Observations ==
The Cat's Eye was the first planetary nebula to be observed with a spectroscope by William Huggins on August 29, 1864. Huggins' observations revealed that the nebula's spectrum was non-continuous and made of a few bright emission lines, first indication that planetary nebulae consist of tenuous ionised gas. Spectroscopic observations at these wavelengths are used in abundance determinations, while images at these wavelengths have been used to reveal the intricate structure of the nebula.

=== Infrared observations ===
Observations of NGC 6543 at far-infrared wavelengths (about 60 μm) reveal the presence of stellar dust at low temperatures. The dust is believed to have formed during the last phases of the progenitor star's life. It absorbs light from the central star and re-radiates it at infrared wavelengths. The spectrum of the infrared dust emission implies that the dust temperature is about 85 K, while the mass of the dust is estimated at 6.4×10^{−4} solar masses.

Infrared emission also reveals the presence of un-ionised material such as molecular hydrogen (H_{2}) and argon. In many planetary nebulae, molecular emission is greatest at larger distances from the star, where more material is un-ionised, but molecular hydrogen emission in NGC 6543 seems to be bright at the inner edge of its outer halo. This may be due to shock waves exciting the H_{2} as ejecta moving at different speeds collide. The overall appearance of the Cat's Eye Nebula in infrared (wavelengths 2–8 μm) is similar in visible light.

=== Optical and ultraviolet observations ===
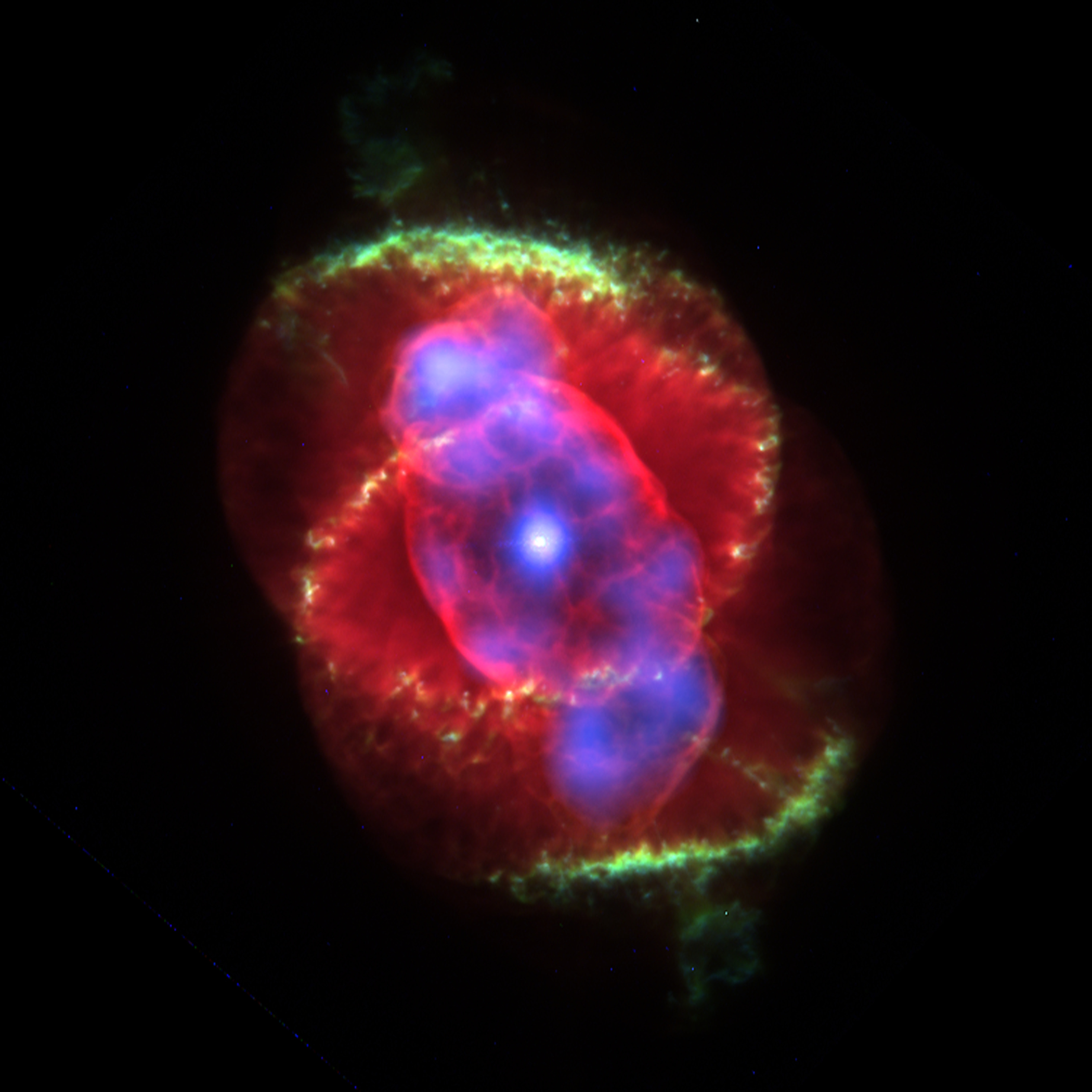
Composite image using optical images from the HST and X-ray data from the Chandra X-ray Observatory

The Hubble Space Telescope image produced here is in false colour, designed to highlight regions of high and low ionisation. Three images were taken, in filters isolating the light emitted by singly ionised hydrogen at 656.3 nm, singly ionised nitrogen at 658.4 nm and doubly ionised oxygen at 500.7 nm. The images were combined as red, green and blue channels respectively, although their true colours are red, red and green. The image reveals two "caps" of less ionised material at the edge of the nebula.

=== X-ray observations ===
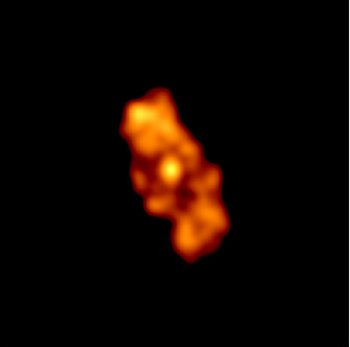
X-ray image of Nebula

In 2001, observations at X-ray wavelengths by the Chandra X-ray Observatory revealed the presence of extremely hot gas within NGC 6543 with the temperature of 1.7×10^{6} K. It is thought that the very hot gas results from the violent interaction of a fast stellar wind with material previously ejected. This interaction has hollowed out the inner bubble of the nebula. Chandra observations have also revealed a point source at the position of the central star. The spectrum of this source extends to the hard part of the X-ray spectrum, to 0.5–1.0 keV. A star with the photospheric temperature of about 100,000 K would not be expected to emit strongly in hard X-rays, and so their presence is something of a mystery. It may suggest the presence of a high temperature accretion disk within a binary star system. The hard X-ray data remain intriguing more than ten years later: the Cat's Eye was included in a 2012 Chandra survey of 21 central stars of planetary nebulae (CSPNe) in the solar neighborhood, which found: "All but one of the X-ray point sources detected at CSPNe display X-ray spectra that are harder than expected from hot (~100,000 K) central star photospheres, possibly indicating a high frequency of binary companions to CSPNe. Other potential explanations include self-shocking winds or PN mass fallback."

== Distance ==
Planetary nebulae distances like NGC 6543 are generally very inaccurate and not well known. Some recent Hubble Space Telescope observations of NGC 6543 taken several years apart determine its distance from the angular expansion rate of 3.457 milliarcseconds per year. Assuming a line of sight expansion velocity of 16.4 km·s^{−1}, this implies that NGC 6543's distance is 1001±269 parsecs (3×10^{19} k or 3300 light-years) away from Earth. Several other distance references, like what is quoted in SIMBAD in 2014 based on Stanghellini, L., et al. (2008) suggest the distance is 1623 parsecs (5300 light-years).

== Age ==
The angular expansion of the nebula can also be used to estimate its age. If it has been expanding at a constant rate of 10 milliarcseconds a year, then it would take 1000±260 years to reach a diameter of 20 arcseconds. This may be an upper limit to the age, because ejected material will be slowed when it encounters material ejected from the star at earlier stages of its evolution, and the interstellar medium.

== Composition ==
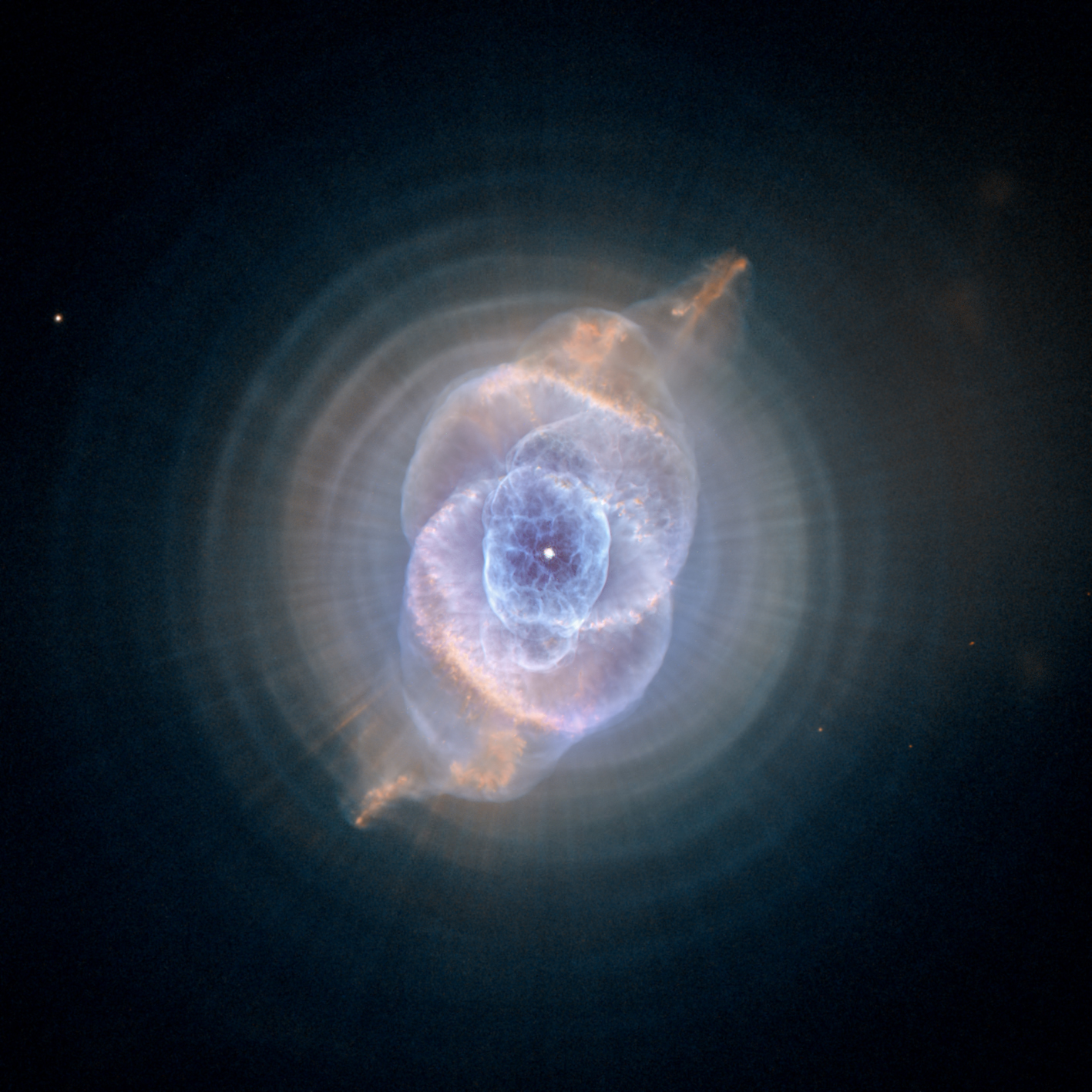
Image of NGC 6543 processed to reveal the concentric rings surrounding the inner core. Also visible are the linear structures, possibly caused by precessing jets from a binary central star system

Like most astronomical objects, NGC 6543 consists mostly of hydrogen and helium, with heavier elements present in small quantities. The exact composition may be determined by spectroscopic studies. Abundances are generally expressed relative to hydrogen, the most abundant element.

Different studies generally find varying values for elemental abundances. This is often because spectrographs attached to telescopes do not collect all the light from objects being observed, instead gathering light from a slit or small aperture. Therefore, different observations may sample different parts of the nebula.

However, results for NGC 6543 broadly agree that, relative to hydrogen, the helium abundance is about 0.12, carbon and nitrogen abundances are both about 3×10^{−4}, and the oxygen abundance is about 7×10^{−4}. These are fairly typical abundances for planetary nebulae, with the carbon, nitrogen and oxygen abundances all larger than the values found for the sun, due to the effects of nucleosynthesis enriching the star's atmosphere in heavy elements before it is ejected as a planetary nebula.

Deep spectroscopic analysis of NGC 6543 may indicate that the nebula contains a small amount of material which is highly enriched in heavy elements; this is discussed below.

== Kinematics and morphology ==
The Cat's Eye Nebula is structurally a very complex nebula, and the mechanism or mechanisms that have given rise to its complicated morphology are not well understood. The central bright part of the nebula consists of the inner elongated bubble (inner ellipse) filled with hot gas. It, in turn, is nested into a pair of larger spherical bubbles conjoined together along their waist. The waist is observed as the second larger ellipse lying perpendicular to the bubble with hot gas.

The structure of the bright portion of the nebula is primarily caused by the interaction of a fast stellar wind being emitted by the central PNN with the visible material ejected during the formation of the nebula. This interaction causes the emission of X-rays discussed above. The stellar wind, blowing with the velocity as high as 1900 km/s, has 'hollowed out' the inner bubble of the nebula, and appears to have burst the bubble at both ends.

It is also suspected that the central WR:+O7 spectral class PNN star, HD 164963 / BD +66 1066 / PPM 20679 of the nebula may be generated by a binary star. The existence of an accretion disk caused by mass transfer between the two components of the system may give rise to astronomical jets, which would interact with previously ejected material. Over time, the direction of the jets would vary due to precession.

Outside the bright inner portion of the nebula, there are a series of concentric rings, thought to have been ejected before the formation of the planetary nebula, while the star was on the asymptotic giant branch of the Hertzsprung–Russell diagram. These rings are very evenly spaced, suggesting that the mechanism responsible for their formation ejected them at very regular intervals and at very similar speeds. The total mass of the rings is about 0.1 solar masses. The pulsations that formed the rings probably started 15,000 years ago and ceased about 1000 years ago, when the formation of the bright central part began (see above).

Further, a large faint halo extends to large distances from the star. The halo again predates the formation of the main nebula. The mass of the halo is estimated as 0.26–0.92 solar masses.

== See also ==
- List of largest nebulae
- List of planetary nebulae

== Cited sources ==
- Balick, Bruce; Preston, Heather L. (October 1987), "A wind-blown bubble model for NGC 6543", Astronomical Journal, 94: 958–963, Bibcode:1987AJ.....94..958B, doi:10.1086/114528
- Balick, Bruce; Wilson, Jeanine; Hajian, Arsen R. (2001), "NGC 6543: The Rings Around the Cat's Eye", Astronomical Journal, 121 (1): 354–361, Bibcode:2001AJ....121..354B, doi:10.1086/318052
- Bianchi, L.; Cerrato, S.; Grewing, M. (November 1986), "Mass loss from central stars of planetary nebulae—the nucleus of NGC 6543", Astronomy and Astrophysics, 169 (1–2): 227–236, Bibcode:1986A&A...169..227B
- Chu, You-Hua; Guerrero, Martı´n A.; Gruendl, Robert A.; Williams, Rosa M.; et al. (2001), "Chandra reveals the X-ray glint in the cat's eye", Astrophysical Journal, 553 (1): L69–L72, arXiv:astro-ph/0101444, Bibcode:2001ApJ...553L..69C, doi:10.1086/320495, S2CID 18254815
- Guerrero, Martín A.; Chu, You-Hua; Gruendl, Robert A.; Williams, Rosa M.; et al. (2001), "The Enigmatic X-Ray Point Sources at the Central Stars of NGC 6543 and NGC 7293", Astrophysical Journal, 553 (1): L55–L58, arXiv:astro-ph/0104270, Bibcode:2001ApJ...553L..55G, doi:10.1086/320509, S2CID 18199443
- Hora, Joseph L.; Latter, William B.; Allen, Lori E.; Marengo, Massimo; et al. (2004), "Infrared Array Camera (IRAC) Observations of Planetary Nebulae", Astrophysical Journal Supplement Series, 154 (1): 296–301, arXiv:astro-ph/0405614, Bibcode:2004ApJS..154..296H, doi:10.1086/422820
- Hyung, S.; Aller, L. H.; Feibelman, W. A.; Lee, W. B.; et al. (2000), "The optical spectrum of the planetary nebula NGC 6543", Monthly Notices of the Royal Astronomical Society, 318 (1): 77–91, Bibcode:2000MNRAS.318...77H, doi:10.1046/j.1365-8711.2000.03642.x
- Kastner, J.; Montez, R. Jr.; Balick, B.; Frew, D. J.; et al. (2012), "The Chandra X-Ray Survey of Planetary Nebulae (CHANPLANS): Probing Binarity, Magnetic Fields, and Wind Collisions", Astronomical Journal, 144 (2): 18, arXiv:1204.6055, Bibcode:2012AJ....144...58K, doi:10.1088/0004-6256/144/2/58, hdl:10486/661899, S2CID 53709567
- Klaas, U.; Walker, S. J.; Müller, T. G.; Richards, P. J.; et al. (2006), "Multi-aperture photometry of extended IR sources with ISOPHOT. I. The nature of extended IR emission of planetary Nebulae", Astronomy and Astrophysics, 452 (2): 523–535, Bibcode:2006A&A...452..523K, doi:10.1051/0004-6361:20053245
- Kwok, Sun (2000), "Chapter 1: History and overview", The origin and evolution of planetary nebulae, Cambridge University Press, pp. 1–7, doi:10.1017/CBO9780511529504, ISBN 978-0-521-62313-1
- Miranda, L. F.; Solf, J. (1992), "Long-slit spectroscopy of the planetary nebula NGC 6543—Collimated bipolar ejections from a precessing central source?", Astronomy and Astrophysics, 260 (1–2): 397–410, Bibcode:1992A&A...260..397M
- Moore, S. L. (2007), "Observing the Cat's Eye Nebula", Journal of the British Astronomical Association, 117 (5): 279–280, Bibcode:2007JBAA..117R.279M
- Reed, Darren S.; Balick, Bruce; Hajian, Arsen R.; Klayton, Tracy L.; et al. (1999), "Hubble Space Telescope Measurements of the Expansion of NGC 6543: Parallax Distance and Nebular Evolution", Astronomical Journal, 118 (5): 2430–2441, arXiv:astro-ph/9907313, Bibcode:1999AJ....118.2430R, doi:10.1086/301091, S2CID 14746840
- SIMBAD (December 22, 2006), Results for Cat's Eye Nebula
- Wesson, R.; Liu, X.-W. (2004), "Physical conditions in the planetary nebula NGC 6543", Monthly Notices of the Royal Astronomical Society, 351 (3): 1026–1042, Bibcode:2004MNRAS.351.1026W, doi:10.1111/j.1365-2966.2004.07856.x
