= Frosty Leo Nebula =

Protoplanetary nebula

Reflection nebula
- Protoplanetary nebula
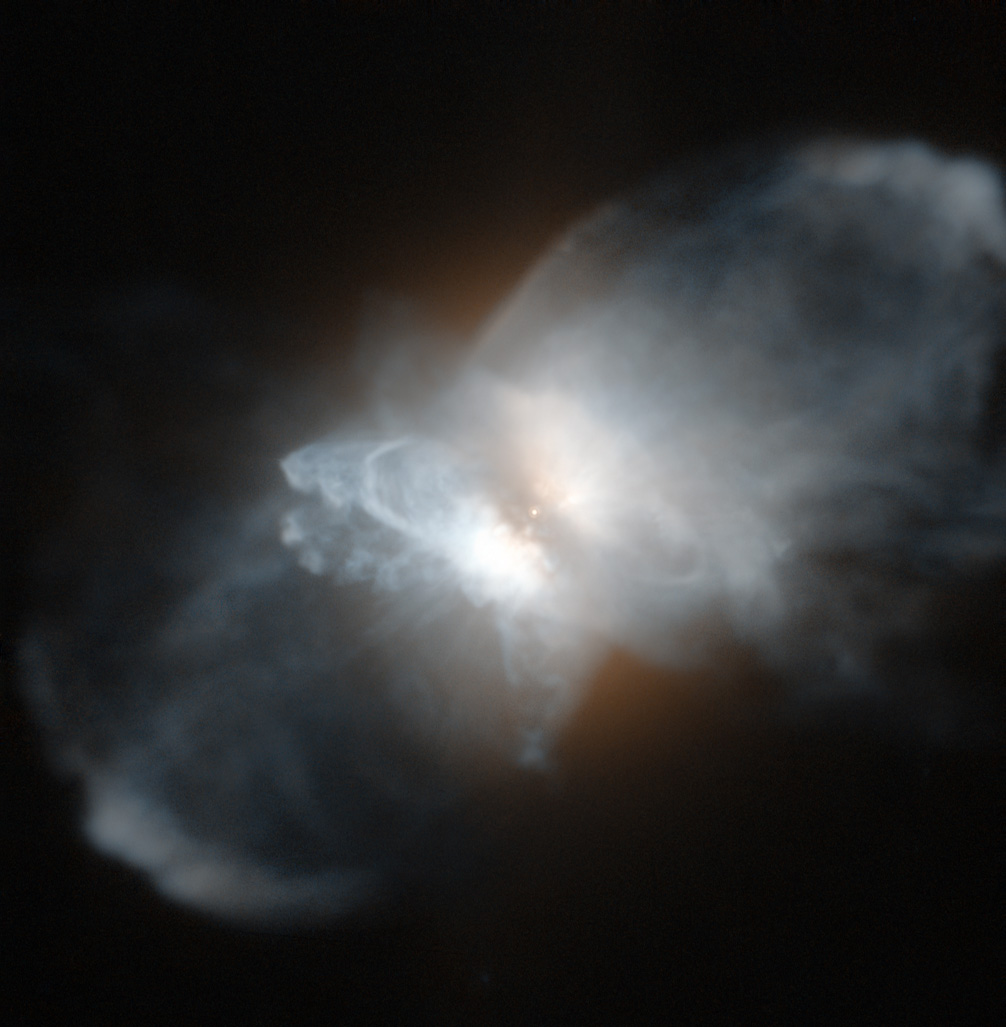
- 2003 Hubble Advanced Camera for Surveys HRC

Observation data: J2000 epoch
- Right ascension: 09^{h} 39^{m} 53.96^{s}
- Declination: +11° 58′ 52.4″
- Distance: 3000 ly
- Apparent magnitude (V): 11
- Apparent dimensions (V): 25″
- Constellation: Leo
- Notable features: Crystalline Ice, Point; Reflection Symmetry
- Designations: IRAS 09371+1212

The Frosty Leo Nebula is a protoplanetary nebula (PPN) located roughly at 3000 light-years away from Earth in the direction of the constellation Leo. It is a spectral bipolar nebula. Its central star is of optical spectral type K7II, by itself called Frosty Leo. It is unusual in that it has an extremely deep absorption feature at 3.1 μm and is unusually located at more than 900 pc above the plane of our galaxy. Further, as of 1990, it has the only known PPN circumstellar outflow in which crystalline ice dominates the long-wavelength emission spectrum and the only known PPN with point-reflection-symmetric deviations from axial symmetry.

== Naming ==
Forveille et al. 1987 dubbed IRAS 09371+1212 as the "Frosty Leo Nebula" because of their interpretation of the object's extremely unusual far infrared spectrum that water is largely depleted in its gaseous state by ice condensation into grains and for its location in the Leo constellation. Their interpretation was subsequently verified in 1988 by three independent papers. Omont et al. 1990 further observed in the band between 35 and 65 μM that very cold (<50 K) silicate dust grains, abundantly coated with crystalline ice, are responsible for the 60-μM excess.

The nebula's central star has itself been called "Frosty Leo"; this name was officially approved by the IAU Working Group on Star Names on 13 June 2026.

== Characteristics ==
The Frosty Leo Nebula has two lobes that are separated by 2″ between which is an almost edge-on dust ring. It also has two relatively faint but prominent compact nebulosities, or ansae, separated by ~23″ along the polar axis of the PPN. The PPN as a whole has an hourglass like shape. It has an inclination angle of 15° relative to the plane of the sky. Its molecular envelope is expanding at a rate of ~25 km/s.

== Observation history ==
This PPN was observed in 1983 by the Infrared Astronomical Satellite (IRAS) and noticed for its exceptionally cold IRAS color temperatures. It also has a uniquely sharp maximum at 60-μM.

== Point symmetry ==
It is the first bipolar PPN known to have point reflection symmetry (all others being axially symmetric). Point symmetry is a fairly common trait of planetary nebulae as found in NGC 2022, NGC 2371-2, NGC 6309, Cat's Eye Nebula, NGC 6563, Dumbbell Nebula, Saturn Nebula, A24, and Hb5. Morris & Reipurth 1990 postulate that point symmetry is either due to the bipolar outflow being directed by a precessing disc or a precessing common envelope binary.
