= Butterfly Nebula =

Butterfly Nebula may refer to:

- M2-9, a bipolar planetary nebula in the constellation Ophiuchus
- NGC 6302, a bipolar planetary nebula in the constellation Scorpius
- NGC 2346, a planetary nebula in the constellation Monoceros
- Little Dumbbell Nebula, a planetary nebula in the constellation Perseus
- IC 1318, an emission nebula in the constellation Cygnus

== See also ==
- Butterfly Cluster
- Butterfly Star
