= Mz 3 =

Planetary nebula in the constellation Norma

Ant Nebula
Emission nebula
- Planetary nebula
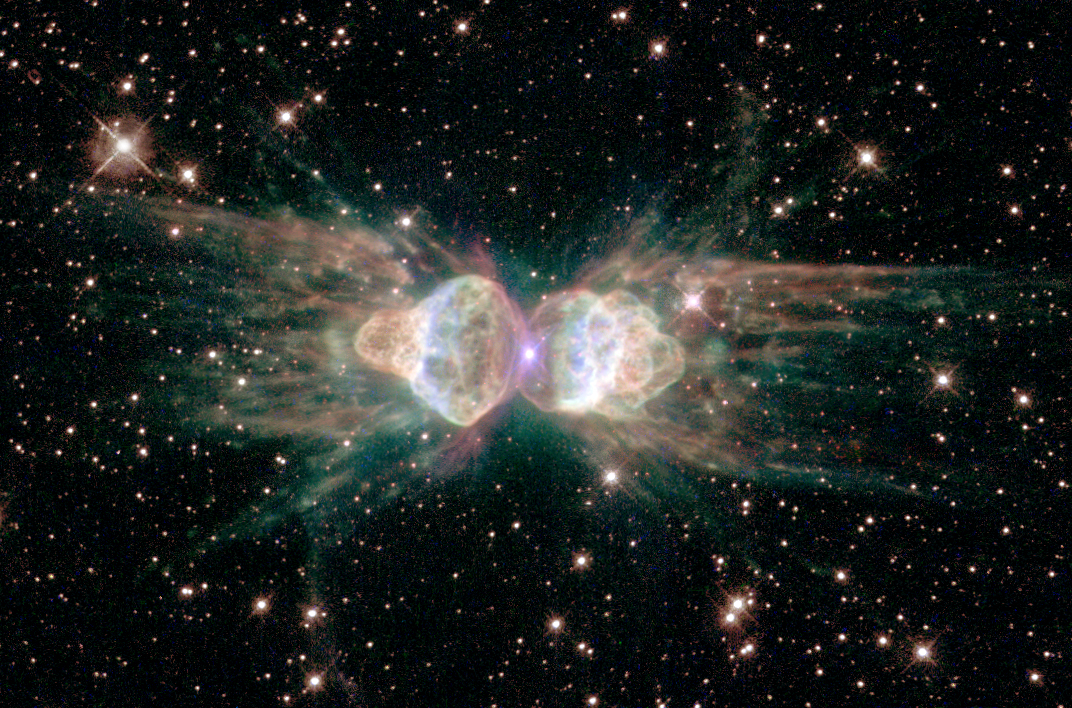
- The Ant Nebula taken by Hubble Space Telescope in 2008

Observation data: J2000 epoch
- Right ascension: 16^{h} 17^{m} 13.392^{s}
- Declination: −51° 59′ 10.31″
- Distance: ~8,000 ly (~2,500 pc) ly
- Apparent magnitude (V): 13.8
- Apparent dimensions (V): >50″ × 12″
- Constellation: Norma

Physical characteristics
- Radius: 1.0 ly^{[a]} ly
- Absolute magnitude (V): 1.8^{[b]}
- Notable features: Three nested pairs of bipolar lobes
- Designations: ESO 225-9, Ant Nebula, Chamber of Horrors^{[c]}, RCW 101

Mz 3 (Menzel 3) is a young bipolar planetary nebula (PN) in the constellation Norma that is composed of a bright core and four distinct high-velocity outflows that have been named lobes, columns, rays, and chakram. These nebulosities are described as: two spherical bipolar lobes, two outer large filamentary hour-glass shaped columns, two cone shaped rays, and a planar radially expanding, elliptically shaped chakram. Mz 3 is a complex system composed of three nested pairs of bipolar lobes and an equatorial ellipse. Its lobes all share the same axis of symmetry but each have very different morphologies and opening angles. It is an unusual PN in that it is believed, by some researchers, to contain a symbiotic binary at its center. One study suggests that the dense nebular gas at its center may have originated from a source different from that of its extended lobes. The working model to explain this hypothesizes that this PN is composed of a giant companion that caused a central dense gas region to form, and a white dwarf that provides ionizing photons for the PN.

Mz 3 is often referred to as the Ant Nebula because it resembles the head and thorax of a garden-variety ant.

== Characteristics ==
Mz 3 is radially expanding at a rate of about 50 km/s and has its polar axis oriented at an angle of around 30° from the plane of the sky (Lopez & Meaburn 1983; Meaburn & Walsh 1985). It is sometimes compared to the more extensively studied Butterfly Nebula (M 2-9), and it is quite likely that both have a similar evolutionary history. They both have point-like bright nuclei, are narrow-waisted bipolar nebulae, and share surprisingly similar spatially dependent spectra. Because of their similarity, their differences are noteworthy. Their greatest difference is probably in their near infrared emissions. Mz 3 has no trace of molecular hydrogen emission, whereas the M 2-9 has prominent H_{2} emission lines in the near-IR. The lack of H_{2} emissions from Mz 3 is unusual given the strong correlation between such emissions and bipolar structures of PN. Additionally, the polar lobes of Mz 3 are more mottled and rounded as compared to M 2-9. Finally, Mz 3 is not known to evidence temporal variability in its polar lobes as is found in M 2-9 (Doyle et al. 2000). (Smith 2003)

The Herschel Space Observatory has detected laser light emissions from the nebula -- specifically, hydrogen recombination line laser emissions. This confirms the presence of a white dwarf with a binary companion at the heart of the nebula.

=== Chakram ===
Of the morphological features of Mz 3, one of the most unusual and odd is the chakram (first noticed in 2004), a faint, large, limb brightened ellipse that appears to have its center on the PN's nucleus. While the plane of the ellipse is near the other feature's shared reflection symmetry plane, it is definitely offset. This structure's kinematics are the only such ones known among studied PN. Unlike all the other Mz 3 structures, there is no increase of velocity as the radial offset from the nucleus increases. Consequently, this must not be a simple equatorial flow despite the fact that its motion appears to be strictly radial (that is, there is no indication of rotation which would suggest that this feature is dynamically stable). All the kinematic properties of the ellipse are symmetric and very ordered relative to the nucleus, consistent with all the other Mz 3 features. Therefore, the ellipse must be historically linked to the evolution of the central star. (Santander-García et al. 2004)

The Ant Nebula is 8,000 light years away from Earth and it has a magnitude of 13.8.

== History ==
Mz 3 was discovered by Donald Howard Menzel in 1922. Menzel 1922

It was studied on July 20, 1997 by astronomers Bruce Balick (University of Washington) and Vincent Icke (Leiden University) on observations done with the Hubble Space Telescope. The telescope was later used on June 30, 1998 by Raghvendra Sahai and John Trauger of the Jet Propulsion Laboratory to picture the PN.

== Notes ==
1. 8,000 ly distance × sin( >50″ diameter_angle / 2 ) = 1.0 ly. radius
2. 13.8 apparent magnitude – 5 * (log_{10}(2,500 pc distance) – 1) = 1.8 absolute magnitude
3. Mz 3 has several components with varying degrees of collimation. It also has an unusual spectrum. Together, these entitle it to the nickname of "The Chamber of Horrors" of planetary nebulae as given by Evans in 1959.
