= Hen 2-437 =

Planetary nebula

Emission nebula
- Planetary nebula
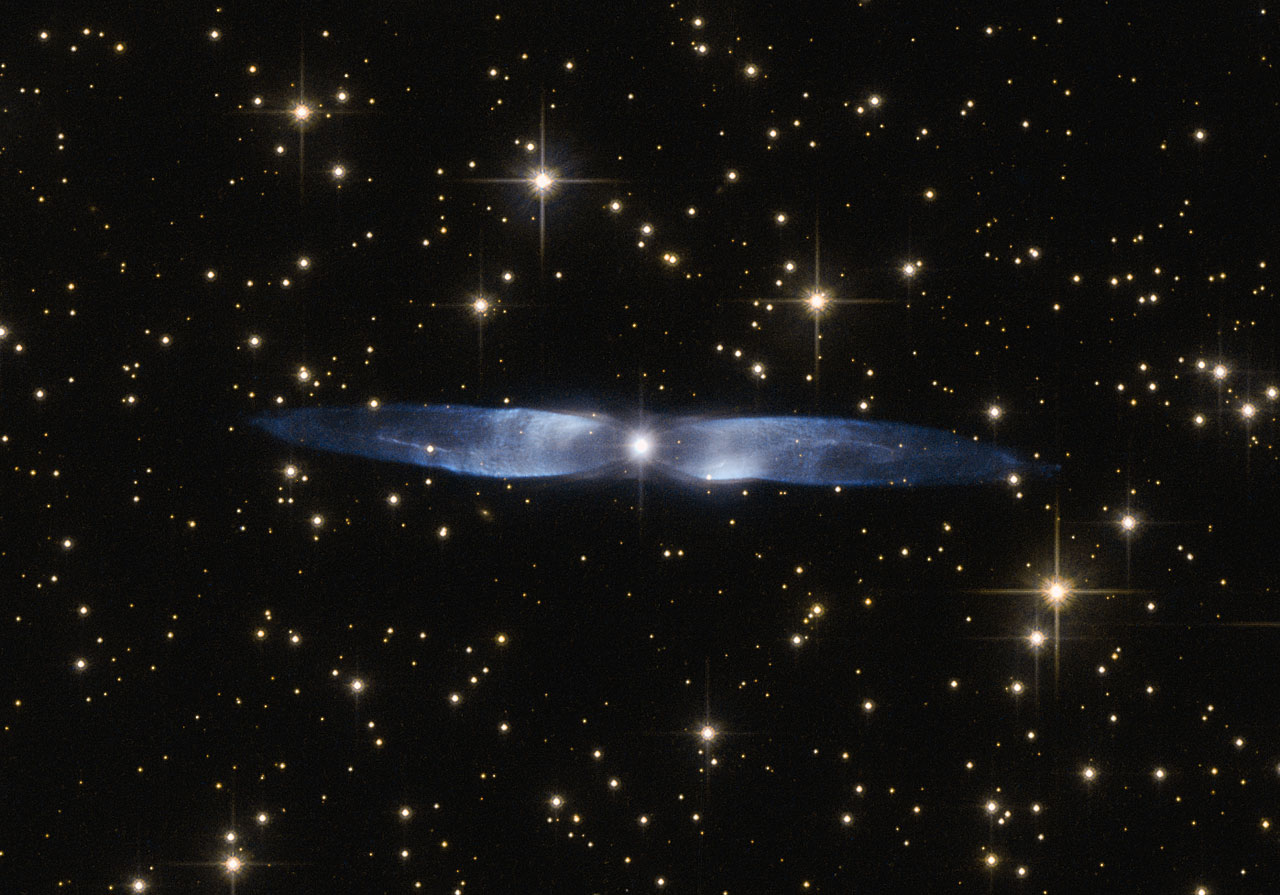

Observation data: J2000 epoch
- Right ascension: 19^{h} 32^{m} 57.657^{s}
- Declination: 26° 52′ 43.35″
- Apparent magnitude (V): 15
- Constellation: Vulpecula
- Notable features: Bipolar outflow, Bipolar nebula
- Designations: Min 1-91; PNG061.3+03.6; PK 061+03 1 PN M 4-15

Hen 2-437 is a bipolar planetary nebula in the constellation Vulpecula. The nebula is notable for its ice blue colorisation. It was first discovered by Rudolph Minkowski in 1946. Hen 2-437 formed when a low mass star similar to the Sun swelled into its red giant phase ejecting its outer layers into space.

== See also ==
- List of largest nebulae
- Lists of nebulae
