= M2-42 =

Planetary nebula

Minkowski 2-42 (M2-42)
Emission nebula
- Planetary nebula
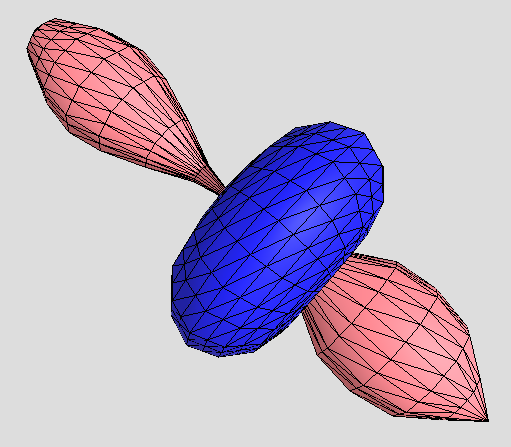

Observation data: J2000 epoch
- Right ascension: 18^{h} 22^{m} 32.08^{s}
- Declination: −24° 09′ 27.7″
- Distance: 30,800 (9444 pc) ly
- Apparent magnitude (V): 13.9
- Apparent dimensions (V): 4″
- Notable features: Bipolar outflow, Bipolar nebula
- Designations: PN M 2-42 PNG 008.2-04.8; PK 008-04 2 Hen 2-393; ESO 522-21; PN Sa 2-331 WRAY 16-409

Minkowski 2-42, abbreviated M2-42, is a planetary nebula that was discovered by Rudolph Minkowski in 1947. It is located about 30,800 light-years away from Earth in the Galactic bulge. It is known to be a bipolar planetary nebula containing two jets of material emerging from both sides of its central star. It has been found that its bipolar outflows have the typical features of Fast Low-Ionization Emission Region (FLIER).

The central star of M2-42 is classified as weak emission-line star, but its nitrogen and helium features may be linked to nitrogen sequences of Wolf-Rayet central stars of planetary nebula ([WN]). The chemical composition of this planetary nebula was found to be around the solar metallicity.

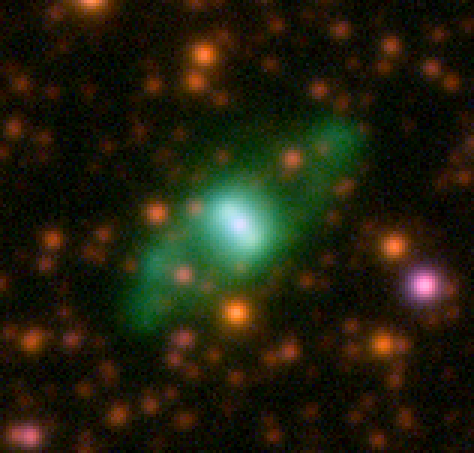
Image of M2-42 taken by the VLT Survey Telescope. The green part of the image was taken with a H-alpha filter.

== See also ==
- List of largest nebulae
- Lists of nebulae
