= J1000+1242 =

Type 2 quasar located in the constellation Leo

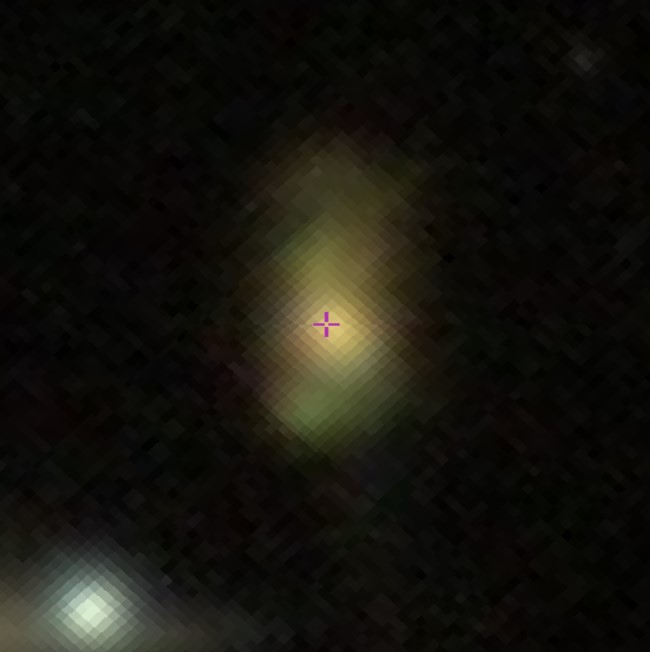
- J1000+1242 taken with SDSS

Observation data (J2000.0 epoch)
- Constellation: Leo
- Right ascension: 10^{h} 00^{m} 13.14^{s}
- Declination: +12° 42′ 26.42″
- Redshift: 0.148195
- Heliocentric radial velocity: 44,428 km/s
- Distance: 2.007 Gly (615.34 Mpc)
- Apparent magnitude (V): 18.34
- Apparent magnitude (B): 19.03

Characteristics
- Type: QSO2, S1
- Size: 74.71 kiloparsecs (243,700 light-years) (diameter; 2MASS K-band total isophote)

Other designations
- LEDA 1414663, SDSS J100013.14+124226.1, IRAS F09575+1256, NVSS J100013+124226, SDSS J1000+1242, 2MASX J10001317+1242261

J1000+1242 known as SDSS J1000+1242 or J1000+12 is a radio-quiet type-2 quasar, located in the constellation Leo. It is located 2 billion light years from Earth and is classified as a Seyfert galaxy.

== Characteristics ==
J1000+1242 has disturbed morphology indicating a galaxy merger. A tidal tail is clearly seen elongating away from the host galaxy towards south by 72 kiloparsecs (kpc), terminating at a location of a small source which implies a tidal dwarf galaxy.

Two unique nuclear emission sources are located in the galaxy. They have a projected separation of around 1.5 kpc indicating the merger resulted J1000+1242 having two active galactic nuclei (AGN) or from both sides of its narrow-line region concealed by a torus of gas and warm dust, or a circumnuclear ring. A bright emission line region is also found northeast of the nucleus of J1000+1242, with an irregular morphology indicating an outflowing bi-polar superbubble.

J1000+1242 has features of a typical AGN. This includes a radio core and hotspot. There is a presence of a deflected radio jet producing diffused lobes in both southeast and northwest directions. Not to mention, J1000+1242 has broad line regions producing emission lines with widths reaching to w_{80} of 850 km s^{−1}. In both around and inside its radio lobes measuring ~ 10 kpc, J1000+1242 has five filamentary molecular gas structures. They seem to wrap around the radio lobes, which ~ 9 percent of the total molecular gas mass is found enclosed within these structures.

== Star formation ==
J1000+1242 has an estimated star formation rate of 50 ± 10 M_{☉} yr^{−1} with infrared luminosity deriving from its star formation in an 8-1000 ɥm range, of 45.0^{+0.1}_{-0.2} erg s^{−1}.

== Black hole ==
The black hole in J1000+1242 is estimated to be 8.47 ± 0.76 M_{☉} based on M_{BH}-σ* relation.
