= Skillman =

Skillman may refer to:

== People with the surname ==
- Becky Skillman (born 1950), American politician
- Evan D. Skillman (born 1955), American astronomer and astrophysicist
- Hope Skillman Schary (c. 1908–1981), American textile designer
- Judith Skillman (born 1954), American poet
- Melanie Skillman (born 1954), American archer

== Places ==
- LBJ/Skillman (DART station), in Dallas, Texas
- Skillman, New Jersey, an unincorporated community within Montgomery Township
