= Bipolar nebula =

Type of nebula that has two lobes extending from a central star

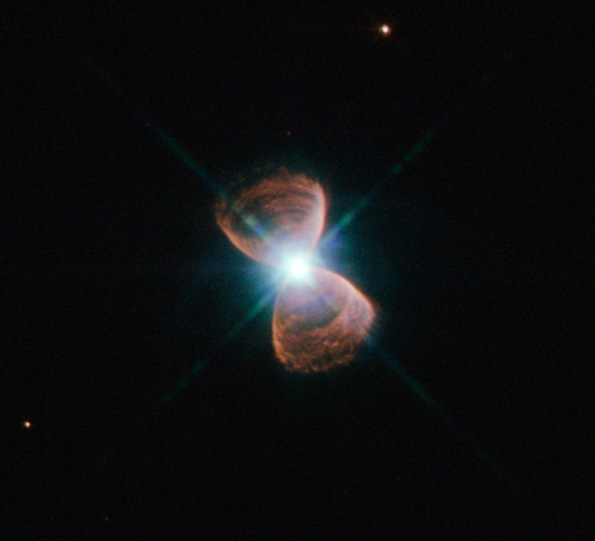
Bipolar planetary nebula Hubble 12.

A bipolar nebula is a type of nebula characterized by two lobes either side of a central star. About 10–20% of planetary nebulae are bipolar.

== Formation ==
Though the exact causes of this nebular structure are not known, it is often thought to imply the presence of a binary central star with a period of a few days to a few years. As one of the two stars expelled its outer layers, the other disrupted the outflow of material to form the bipolar shape.

== Examples ==
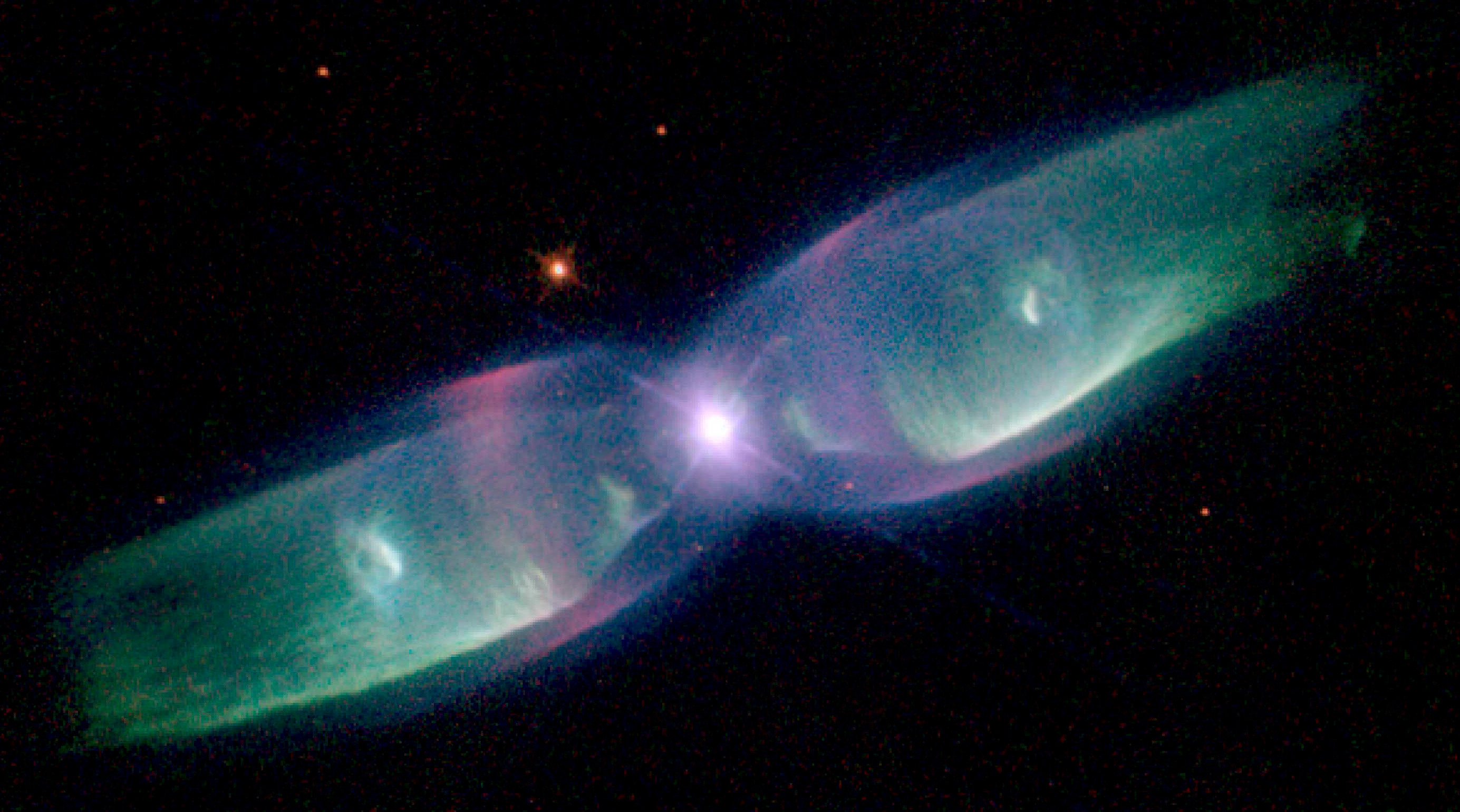
Planetary Nebula M2-9, otherwise known as the Twin Jet Nebula or the Wings of a Butterfly Nebula, is a bipolar nebula.

- Homunculus Nebula around Eta Carinae
- Hubble 5
- Hubble 12
- M2-9 – The Wings of a Butterfly Nebula
- OH231.8+4.2 – The Calabash Nebula or Rotten Egg Nebula
- Mz3 (or Menzel 3) – The Ant Nebula
- CRL 618 – The Westbrook Nebula
- CRL 2688 – The Egg Nebula
- HD 44179 – The Red Rectangle Nebula
- MyCn18 – The Engraved Hourglass Nebula
- He2-104 – The Southern Crab Nebula
- The Boomerang Nebula
- NGC 2346 – Also known as the Butterfly Nebula
- NGC 6302 – The Bug or Butterfly Nebula
- KjPn 8 Nebula – The largest (in angular size) bipolar planetary nebula.

== See also ==
- Bipolar outflow
- Stellar evolution
