= Rudolph Minkowski =

German-American astronomer

- Born: May 28, 1895; Strasbourg, German Empire
- Died: January 4, 1976 (aged 80); Berkeley, California
- Known for: supernovae
- Awards: Bruce Medal in 1961
- Scientific career
- Fields: Astronomy
- Workplaces: Palomar Observatory

Rudolph Minkowski (born Rudolf Leo Bernhard Minkowski /mɪŋˈkɔːfski, -ˈkɒf-/; German: [mɪŋˈkɔfski]; May 28, 1895 – January 4, 1976) was a German-American astronomer.

== Biography ==
Asteroids discovered: 1
1620 Geographos	September 14, 1951

Minkowski was the son of Marie Johanna Siegel and physiologist Oskar Minkowski. His uncle was Hermann Minkowski, a mathematician and one of Einstein's teachers in Zürich. Rudolph studied supernovae and, together with Walter Baade, divided them into two classes (Type I and Type II) based on their spectral characteristics. He and Baade also found optical counterparts to various radio sources.

He headed the National Geographic Society – Palomar Observatory Sky Survey, a photographic atlas of the entire northern sky (and south to declination -22°) down to an apparent magnitude of 22.

Together with Albert George Wilson, he co-discovered the near-Earth Apollo asteroid 1620 Geographos in 1951. He additionally discovered a correlation between the luminosity of early-type galaxies and their velocity dispersion, which was later quantified by Faber and Jackson. He won the Bruce Medal in 1961. The lunar crater Minkowski is named after him and his uncle.

In the 1940s, he created a catalog of nearly 200 planetary nebulae, including Minkowski 2-9, and a dwarf galaxy near NGC 541, known as Minkowski's Object, is named after him.

== List of discovered astronomical objects ==
Name	Discovery Year	Type	Ref.
1620 Geographos	1951	Asteroid	
M1-42	1946	Planetary nebula	
M1-63	1946	Planetary nebula	
M1-91	1946	Planetary nebula	
M1-92	1946	Protoplanetary nebula	
M2-9	1947	Planetary nebula	
M2-42	1947	Planetary nebula	
M4-18	1959	Planetary nebula (Note: Also classified as a protoplanetary nebula according to Surendiranath & Kameswara Rao (1995).)	

== Bibliography ==
- Minkowski, R (1960), "International Cooperative Efforts Directed Toward Optical Identification of Radio Sources", Proc. Natl. Acad. Sci. U.S.A., vol. 46, no. 1 (published Jan 1960), pp. 13–9, Bibcode:1960PNAS...46...13M, doi:10.1073/pnas.46.1.13, PMC 284999, PMID 16590587
