= Donald Howard Menzel =

American astronomer (1901–1976)

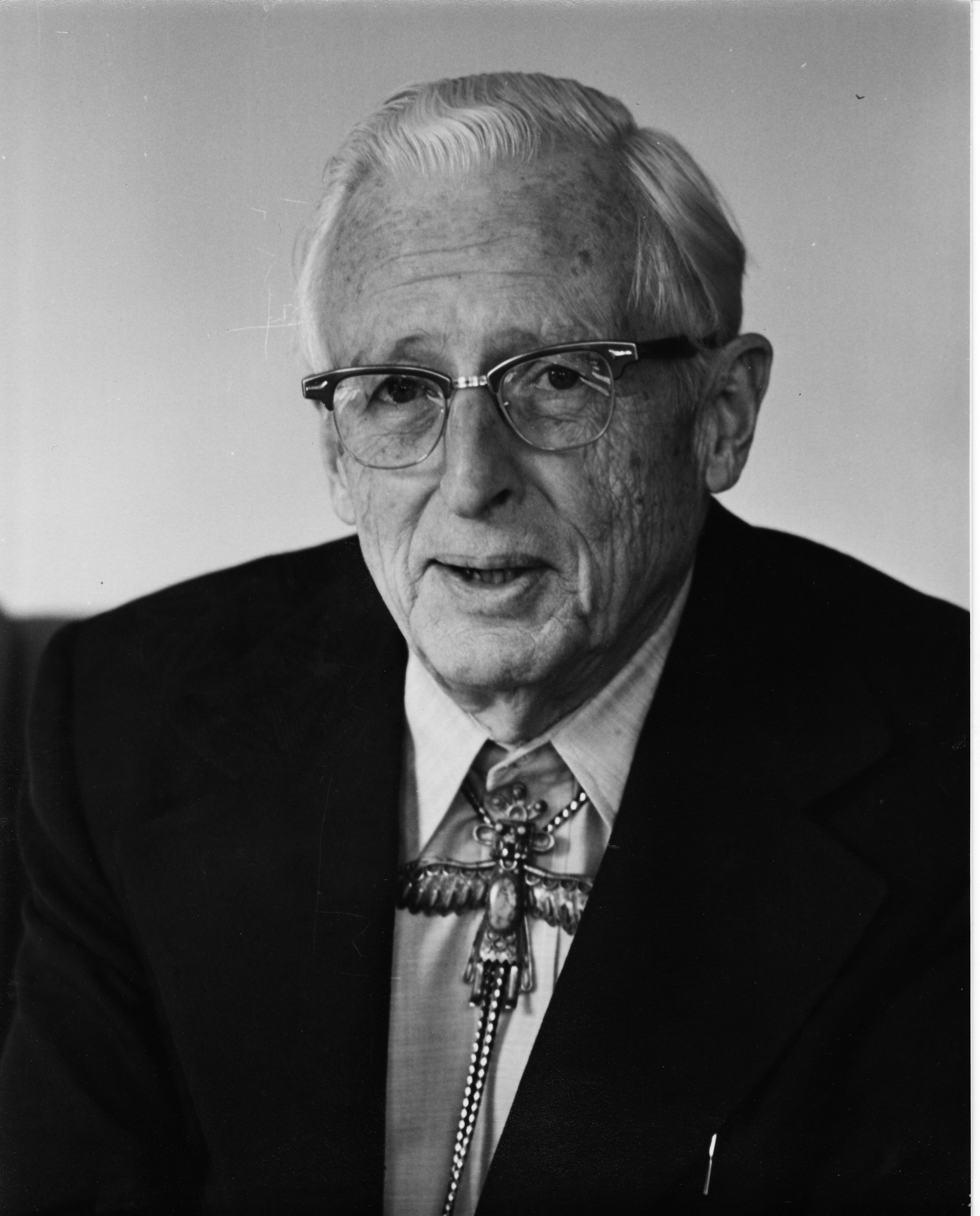
- Born: April 11, 1901; Florence, Colorado, US
- Died: December 14, 1976 (aged 75); Boston, Massachusetts, US
- Education: University of Denver; Princeton University
- Scientific career
- Fields: Astronomy, astrophysics, star formation
- Workplaces: Lick Observatory, Harvard, Center for Astrophysics | Harvard & Smithsonian
- Doctoral advisor: Henry Norris Russell
- Doctoral students: Jesse L. Greenstein, Elsa van Dien, Fred Whipple

Donald Howard Menzel (April 11, 1901 – December 14, 1976) was one of the first theoretical astronomers and astrophysicists in the United States. He discovered the physical properties of the solar chromosphere, the chemistry of stars, the atmosphere of Mars, and the nature of gaseous nebulae.

== Biography ==
Born in Florence, Colorado in 1901 and raised in Leadville, he learned to read very early, and soon could send and receive messages in Morse code, taught by his father. He loved science and mathematics, collected ore and rock specimens, and as a teenager he built a large chemistry laboratory in the cellar. He made a radio transmitter at a time when kits were rarely available and qualified as a radio ham. He was an Eagle Scout, specializing in cryptanalysis, as well as an outdoorsman, hiking and fly fishing throughout much of his life. He married Florence Elizabeth Kreager on June 17, 1926. They had two daughters, Suzanne Kay and Elizabeth Ina.

At 16, he enrolled in the University of Denver to study chemistry. His interest in astronomy was aroused through a boyhood friend (Edgar Kettering), through observing the solar eclipse of June 8, 1918, and through observing the eruption of Nova Aquilae 1918 (V603 Aquilae). He graduated from the University of Denver in 1920 with a bachelor's degree in chemistry and stayed on to receive a master's degree in chemistry and mathematics from the institution in 1921. He also found summer positions in 1922, 1923, and 1924 as research assistant to Harlow Shapley at the Harvard College Observatory.

At Princeton University he acquired a second master's degree in astronomy in 1923, and in 1924 a Ph.D. in astrophysics for which his advisor was Henry Norris Russell, who inspired his interest in theoretical astronomy. After teaching for two years at the University of Iowa and Ohio State University, in 1926 he was appointed assistant professor at Lick Observatory, where he worked for several years. He moved to Harvard University in 1932.

During World War II, Menzel was commissioned as a lieutenant commander in the United States Navy and asked to head a division of intelligence, where he used his many-sided talents, including deciphering enemy codes. Even until 1955, he worked with the Navy improving radio-wave propagation by tracking the Sun's emissions and studying the effect of the aurora on radio propagation for the Department of Defense. Returning to Harvard after the war, he was appointed acting director of the Harvard Observatory in 1952, and was the full director from 1954 to 1966. His colleague Dr. Dorrit Hoffleit recalls one of his first actions in the position was asking his secretary to destroy a third of the plates sight unseen, resulting in their permanent loss from the record. The term "Menzel Gap" was used to refer to the 1953–1968 absence of astronomical photographic plates when plate-making operations were temporarily halted by Menzel as a cost-cutting measure. He retired from Harvard in 1971. From 1964 to his death, Menzel was a U.S. State Department consultant for Latin American affairs.

Menzel was elected to the American Academy of Arts and Sciences in 1934, the American Philosophical Society in 1943, and the United States National Academy of Sciences in 1948. He received honorary A.M. and Sc.D. degrees from Harvard University in 1942 and the University of Denver in 1954 respectively. From 1946 to 1948 he was the vice president of the American Astronomical Society, becoming their president from 1954 to 1956. In 1965, Menzel was given the John Evans Award of the University of Denver. In May 2001, the Center for Astrophysics | Harvard & Smithsonian hosted "Donald H. Menzel: Scientist, Educator, Builder," a symposium in honor of the 100th anniversary of the birth of Donald H. Menzel.

Menzel traveled with several expeditions to view solar eclipses to obtain scientific data. On 19 June 1936, he led the Harvard-MIT expedition to the steppes of Russia (at Akbulak in Orenburg Oblast, southern Ural) to observe a total eclipse. For the 9 July 1945 eclipse, he directed the Joint U.S.-Canadian expedition to Saskatchewan, although they were clouded out. Menzel observed many total solar eclipses, often leading the expeditions, including Catalina, California (10 September 1923, cloudy), Camptonville, California (28 April 1930), Fryeburg, Maine (31 August 1932), Minneapolis-St. Paul, Minnesota (30 June 1954), the Atlantic coast of Massachusetts (2 October 1959), northern Italy (15 February 1951), Orono, Maine (20 July 1963, cloudy), Athens/Sunion Road, Greece (20 May 1966), Arequipa, Peru (12 November 1966), Miahuatlan, south of Oaxaca, Mexico (7 March 1970), Prince Edward Island Canada (10 July 1972), and western Mauritania (30 June 1973), in addition to the other three mentioned above. He proudly held the informal record for greatest number of observed solar eclipses, a "title" later broken by his student, colleague, and co-author Jay Pasachoff.

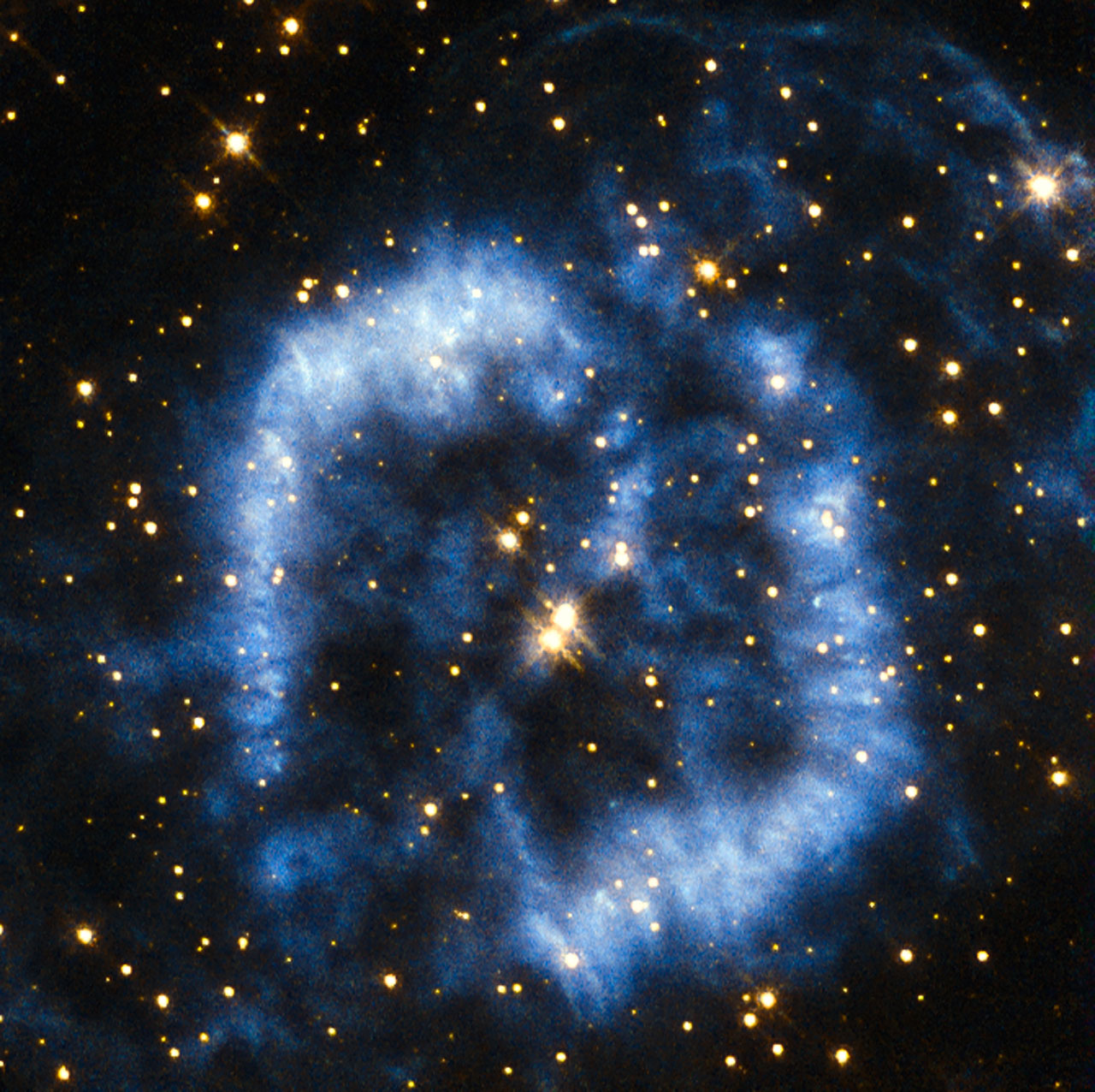
Planetary nebula PK 329-02.2, also known as Menzel 2, or Mz 2. It was discovered in 1922.

In the late 1930s, he built an observatory for solar research at Climax, CO, using a telescope that mimicked a total eclipse of the sun, allowing him and his colleagues to study the solar corona and to film the spouting flames, called prominences, emitted by the Sun. Menzel initially performed solar research, but later concentrated on studying gaseous nebulae. His work with Lawrence Aller and James Gilbert Baker defined many of the fundamental principles of the study of planetary nebulae. He wrote the first edition (1964) of A Field Guide to the Stars and Planets, part of the Peterson Field Guides. In one of his last papers, Menzel concluded, based on his analysis of the Schwarzschild equations, that black holes do not exist, and he declared them to be a myth.

He also believed in the EPH (exploded planet hypothesis), stating, 'Almost all of these little planets orbit between Mars and Jupiter. It is thought that they are the scattered fragments of a large planet that broke apart.'

Menzel was a science fiction author; his "Fin's Funeral" appeared in Galaxy Science Fiction in 1965. He was also an artist, creating watercolor paintings of alien creatures and scenes which often featured three-dimensional "holes" though characters, clouds, and alien spaceships.

== Menzel's Field Guide ==
Menzel wrote the first edition of A Field Guide to the Stars and Planets, published in 1964 by Houghton Mifflin, which rapidly became a best-seller. Subsequent editions were prepared after Menzel's death by his student Jay Pasachoff; the current version is one of the Peterson Field Guides.

In Chapter IV of the first edition, Menzel apportions all 88 of the modern constellations recognized by the International Astronomical Union into eight broad families, as a way to help observers remember where the constellations are located.

The families are organized by common location or common theme. The Ursa Major, Perseus, Hercules, and Orion families include mainly constellations in the general vicinity of those four constellations. The Zodiac family includes the traditional twelve Zodiac constellations. The Heavenly Waters family includes mostly constellations generally associated with water. The Bayer family includes southern constellations first introduced by Plancius and subsequently included in Johann Bayer's Uranometria in 1603. The La Caille family includes most of the constellations introduced by Lacaille in 1756 from stars charted during his observations at Cape Town.

Menzel Family	Constellations in the family
Ursa Major	Boötes, Camelopardalis, Canes Venatici, Coma Berenices, Corona Borealis, Draco, Leo Minor, Lynx, Ursa Major, Ursa Minor
Zodiac	Aquarius, Aries, Cancer, Capricornus, Gemini, Leo, Libra, Pisces, Sagittarius, Scorpius, Taurus, Virgo
Perseus	Andromeda, Auriga, Cassiopeia, Cepheus, Cetus, Lacerta, Pegasus, Perseus, Triangulum
Hercules	Aquila, Ara, Centaurus, Corona Australis, Corvus, Crater, Crux, Cygnus, Hercules, Hydra, Lupus, Lyra, Ophiuchus, Sagitta, Scutum, Serpens, Sextans, Triangulum Australe, Vulpecula
Orion	Canis Major, Canis Minor, Lepus, Monoceros, Orion
Heavenly Waters	Carina, Columba, Delphinus, Equuleus, Eridanus, Piscis Austrinus, Puppis, Pyxis, Vela
Bayer	Apus, Chamaeleon, Dorado, Grus, Hydrus, Indus, Musca, Pavo, Phoenix, Tucana, Volans
La Caille	Antlia, Caelum, Circinus, Fornax, Horologium, Mensa, Microscopium, Norma, Octans, Pictor, Reticulum, Sculptor, Telescopium

These families have little currency today, and recent editions of the field guide no longer mention them.

== Menzel and UFOs ==
Menzel's cover art, Galaxy Science Fiction, 10/1969

In addition to his academic and popular contributions to the field of astronomy, Menzel was a prominent skeptic concerning the reality of UFOs. He authored or co-authored three popular books debunking UFOs: Flying Saucers - Myth - Truth - History (1953), The World of Flying Saucers (1963, co-authored with Lyle G. Boyd), and The UFO Enigma (1977, co-authored with Ernest H. Taves). All of Menzel's UFO books argued that UFOs are nothing more than misidentification of prosaic phenomena such as stars, clouds and airplanes; or the result of people seeing unusual atmospheric phenomena they were unfamiliar with. He was among the first prominent scientists to offer an opinion on the matter. One of Menzel's earliest public involvements in UFO matters was his appearance on a radio documentary directed and narrated by Edward R. Murrow in mid-1950. (Swords, 98)

Menzel claimed to have had his own UFO experience on 3 March 1955 while returning from the North Pole on the daily Air Force Weather "Ptarmigan" flight. His account is in both Menzel & Boyd and Menzel & Taves, in which he identified the 'flying saucer' he observed, as a mirage of Sirius (Steuart Campbell claimed that it was a mirage of Saturn). Menzel often explained that atmospheric hazes or temperature inversions could distort stars or planets, and make them appear to be larger than in reality, unusual in their shape, and in motion.

In 1968, Menzel testified before the U.S. House Committee on Science and Astronautics – Symposium on UFOs, stating that he considered all UFO sightings to have natural explanations.

== Legacy ==
In 1922 he discovered the Menzel 3 nebula, informally known as the Ant Nebula. The minor planet 1967 Menzel was named in his honor, as well as a small lunar crater located in the southeast of Mare Tranquilitatis, the Sea of Tranquility. He was awarded the Prix Jules Janssen by the Société astronomique de France in 1976.

== Sources ==
- Story, R.; Greenwell, J. R. (1980). "Menzel, Donald H.". The Encyclopedia of UFOs. Doubleday. pp. 229–230. ISBN 978-0-385-13677-8.
- Pasachoff, J. (2002). "Menzel and Eclipses". Journal for the History of Astronomy. 33 (2): 139–156. Bibcode:2002JHA....33..139P. doi:10.1177/002182860203300205. S2CID 116430665.
- Swords, M. D. (2000). "UFOs, the Military, and the Early Cold War Era". In Jacobs, D. M. (ed.). UFOs and Abductions: Challenging the Borders of Knowledge. University Press of Kansas. pp. 82–121. ISBN 978-0-7006-1032-7.
- Bogdan, T. J. (2007). "Menzel, Donald Howard". The Biographical Encyclopedia of Astronomers. Vol. 13. pp. 769–770. doi:10.1007/978-0-387-30400-7_939. ISBN 978-0-387-31022-0.
- "Papers of Donald Howard Menzel: An inventory". Harvard University Library. 2005. Archived from the original on 2016-03-04.

== Publications ==
Menzel published over 270 scientific and other papers.

- Menzel, D. H. (1924). A Study of Line Intensities in Stellar Spectra (Ph.D Thesis). Princeton University.
- Menzel, D. H. (1926). "The Atmosphere of Mars". The Astrophysical Journal. 63: 48–59. Bibcode:1926ApJ....63...48M. doi:10.1086/142949.
- Menzel, D. H. (1927). "Pressure Decomposition as a Source of Solar Energy". Science. 65 (1687): 422–423. Bibcode:1927Sci....65..422M. doi:10.1126/science.65.1687.422-a. PMID 17771152.
- Menzel, D. H. (1927). "The Source of Solar Energy". Science. 65 (1688): 431–438. Bibcode:1927Sci....65..431M. doi:10.1126/science.65.1688.431. PMID 17736928. S2CID 23879476.
- Menzel, D. H. (1931). Stars and Planets: Exploring the universe. The University Society. Bibcode:1931speu.book.....M. LCCN 32000650.
- Menzel, D. H. (1931). "A Study of the Solar Chromosphere". Publications of the Lick Observatory. 17 (1): 1–303. Bibcode:1930PLicO..17....1M.
- Menzel, D. H. (1932). "Blast of Giant Atom Created Our Universe". Popular Science. pp. 28–30. Archived from the original on 2011-08-31.
- Menzel, D. H. (1933). "A Simple Derivation of the Dissociation Formula". Proceedings of the National Academy of Sciences. 19 (1): 40–44. Bibcode:1933PNAS...19...40M. doi:10.1073/pnas.19.1.40. PMC 1085875. PMID 16587746.
- Menzel, D. H.; Payne, C. H. (1933). "On the Interpretation of Nova Spectra". Proceedings of the National Academy of Sciences. 19 (7): 641–648. Bibcode:1933PNAS...19..641M. doi:10.1073/pnas.19.7.641. PMC 1086128. PMID 16577542.
- Boyce, J. C.; Menzel, D. H.; Payne, C. H. (1933). "Forbidden Lines in Astrophysical Sources". Proceedings of the National Academy of Sciences. 19 (6): 581–591. Bibcode:1933PNAS...19..581B. doi:10.1073/pnas.19.6.581. PMC 1086096. PMID 16587791.
- Menzel, D. H.; Marshall, R. K. (1933). "Neon Absorption Lines in Stellar Spectra". Proceedings of the National Academy of Sciences. 19 (10): 879–881. Bibcode:1933PNAS...19..879M. doi:10.1073/pnas.19.10.879. PMC 1086222. PMID 16587803.
- Russell, H. N.; Menzel, D. H. (1933). "The Terrestrial Abundance of the Permanent Gases". Proceedings of the National Academy of Sciences. 19 (12): 997–1001. Bibcode:1933PNAS...19..997R. doi:10.1073/pnas.19.12.997. PMC 1086270. PMID 16587829.
- Menzel, D. H. (1938). Stars and Planets: Exploring the universe. The University Society. Bibcode:1938speu.book.....M. LCCN 38038813.
- Menzel, D. H. (1948). Elementary Manual of Radio Propagation. Prentice-Hall. LCCN 48002219.
- Menzel, D. H. (1949). Our Sun. Blakiston Co. LCCN 59012975.
- Menzel, D. H. (1950). "Origin of Sunspots". Nature. 166 (4209): 31–32. Bibcode:1950Natur.166...31M. doi:10.1038/166031b0. PMID 15439102. S2CID 4270862.
- Menzel, D. H. (1953). Mathematical Physics. Prentice-Hall. LCCN 53007714.
- Menzel, D. H. (1953). Flying Saucers. Harvard University Press. LCCN 52012419.
- Menzel, D. H. (1955). Fundamental Formulas of Physics. Prentice-Hall. LCCN 55014512.
- Menzel, D. H. (1957). The Edge of the Sun. Smithsonian Institution. LCCN 58002324.
- Menzel, D. H. (1960). The Radio Noise Spectrum. Harvard University Press. Bibcode:1960rns..book.....M. LCCN 60007997.
- Menzel, D. H. (1960). Fundamental Formulas of Physics. Dover Publications. LCCN 60051149.
- Menzel, D. H.; Jones, H. M.; Boyd, L. G. (1961). Writing a Technical Paper. McGraw-Hill. Bibcode:1961wtp..book.....M. LCCN 61007581.
- Menzel, D. H. (1962). "Physics of the Solar Chromosphere. Richard N. Thomas and R. Grant Athay. Interscience (Wiley), New York, 1961. x + 422 pp. Illus. $15.50". Science. 137 (3533): 848–849. doi:10.1126/science.137.3533.848-a. PMID 17787332. S2CID 43168353.
- Menzel, D. H.; Boyd, L. G. (1963). The World of Flying Saucers: A Scientific Examination of a Major Myth of the Space Age. Doubleday. LCCN 63012989.
- Menzel, D. H. (1965). "Observatory on the Moon". Galaxy Science Fiction. pp. 143–146.
- Menzel, D. H.; Yü, C. S. (1970). Astronomy. Random House. LCCN 70127542.
- Martin, M. E.; Menzel, D. H. (1964). The Friendly Stars. Dover Publications. ISBN 978-0-486-21099-5.
  - Budrys, Algis; Pohl, Frederik (April 1965). "Galaxy Bookshelf". Galaxy Science Fiction. pp. 137–145.
- Menzel, D. H.; Pasachoff, J. M. (1970). "The Outer Corona at the Eclipse of March 7, 1970". Nature. 226 (5251): 1143–1144. Bibcode:1970Natur.226.1143M. doi:10.1038/2261143a0. PMID 16057713. S2CID 4179352.
- Menzel, D. H.; Taves, E. H. (1977). The UFO Enigma. Doubleday. ISBN 978-0-385-03596-5.

He also wrote a popular account of astronomy: A Field Guide to the Stars and Planets Including the Moon, Satellites, Comets and Other Features of the Universe (1975); 2nd edition (1984) by Menzel and Pasachoff, 3rd edition (1992) by Pasachoff and Menzel, 4th edition (2000) by Pasachoff.
