= Evan D. Skillman =

Evan David Skillman (born January 27, 1955, in Rochester, New York) is an American astronomer and astrophysicist.

== Education and career ==
Evan Skillman graduated in 1977 with a B.A. in physics from Cornell University and in 1984 with a Ph.D. in astronomy from Seattle's University of Washington. His Ph.D. thesis Physical Conditions in Giant Extragalactic H II Regions was supervised by Bruce Balick. Skillman was a postdoc at the ASTRON Netherlands Foundation for Radio Astronomy, where his supervisor was Thijs van der Hulst, and then at the University of Texas, where his supervisor was Gregory A. Shields. In 1989 Skillman became a faculty member in the University of Minnesota's astronomy department, where he is now the director of the Minnesota Institute for Astrophysics and a College of Science and Engineering Distinguished Professor. He took leave of absence for sabbatical years at Garching's Max Planck Institute for Astrophysics, where his host was Simon White, and at the University of Cambridge's Institute of Astronomy, where his host was Stephen Smartt. In 2012 and 2013, Skillman was one of the leaders of the Panchromatic Hubble Andromeda Treasury (PHAT) project. Part of the project made available large amounts of Hubble Space Telescope image data and used volunteer citizen scientists to analyze stellar clusters in the Andromeda Galaxy. The large number of citizen scientists accomplished in 12 days what would have taken the far smaller team of professional scientists approximately one year.

Skillman has done research on "the interstellar medium, the stellar populations, the chemical abundances, and the dark matter content of nearby galaxies, with a focus on dwarf galaxies." In 2018 he was elected a Fellow of the American Physical Society for "observational constraints on the primordial helium abundance and significant contributions to understanding the chemical evolution of galaxies."

== Family ==
His sister, Leslie Elaine Skillman-Hull (1953–2020), was an assistant professor in women's health care and an accomplished potter.

== Selected publications ==
=== Articles ===
- Skillman, Evan D.; Kennicutt, R. C.; Hodge, P. W. (1989). "Oxygen abundances in nearby dwarf irregular galaxies". The Astrophysical Journal. 347: 875. Bibcode:1989ApJ...347..875S. doi:10.1086/168178. (over 700 citations)
- Skillman, Evan D.; Kennicutt, Robert C. Jr. (1993). "Spatially resolved optical and near-infrared spectroscopy of I ZW 18". The Astrophysical Journal. 411: 655. Bibcode:1993ApJ...411..655S. doi:10.1086/172868. hdl:2060/19910004841. S2CID 123245846.
- Van Der Hulst, J. M.; Skillman, E. D.; Smith, T. R.; Bothun, G. D.; McGaugh, S. S.; De Blok, W. J. G. (1993). "Star formation thresholds in Low Surface Brightness galaxies". The Astronomical Journal. 106: 548. Bibcode:1993AJ....106..548V. doi:10.1086/116660. hdl:1903/8710.
- Garnett, D. R.; Skillman, E. D.; Dufour, R. J.; Peimbert, M.; Torres-Peimbert, S.; Terlevich, R.; Terlevich, E.; Shields, G. A. (1995). "The evolution of C/O in dwarf galaxies from Hubble Space Telescope FOS observations". The Astrophysical Journal. 443: 64. arXiv:astro-ph/9411011. Bibcode:1995ApJ...443...64G. doi:10.1086/175503. S2CID 118743858.
- Kobulnicky, Henry A.; Skillman, Evan D. (1996). "Elemental Abundance Variations and Chemical Enrichment from Massive Stars in Starbursts. I. NGC 4214". The Astrophysical Journal. 471: 211–236. Bibcode:1996ApJ...471..211K. doi:10.1086/177964. S2CID 249398869.
- Garnett, D. R.; Shields, G. A.; Skillman, E. D.; Sagan, S. P.; Dufour, R. J. (1997). "Interstellar Abundance Gradients in NGC 2403: Comparison to M33". The Astrophysical Journal. 489 (1): 63–86. Bibcode:1997ApJ...489...63G. doi:10.1086/304775. S2CID 120558849.
- Kobulnicky, Henry A.; Skillman, Evan D. (1997). "Elemental Abundance Variations and Chemical Enrichment from Massive Stars in Starbursts. II. NGC 1569". The Astrophysical Journal. 489 (2): 636–655. arXiv:astro-ph/9706235. Bibcode:1997ApJ...489..636K. doi:10.1086/304830. S2CID 117118137.
- Benjamin, Robert A.; Skillman, Evan D.; Smits, Derck P. (1999). "Improving Predictions for Helium Emission Lines". The Astrophysical Journal. 514 (1): 307–324. arXiv:astro-ph/9810087. Bibcode:1999ApJ...514..307B. doi:10.1086/306923. S2CID 16422400.
- Olive, Keith A.; Skillman, Evan D. (2004). "A Realistic Determination of the Error on the Primordial Helium Abundance: Steps toward Nonparametric Nebular Helium Abundances". The Astrophysical Journal. 617 (1): 29–49. arXiv:astro-ph/0405588. Bibcode:2004ApJ...617...29O. doi:10.1086/425170. S2CID 15187664.
- Lee, Henry; Skillman, Evan D.; Cannon, John M.; Jackson, Dale C.; Gehrz, Robert D.; Polomski, Elisha F.; Woodward, Charles E. (2006). "On Extending the Mass-Metallicity Relation of Galaxies by 2.5 Decades in Stellar Mass". The Astrophysical Journal. 647 (2): 970–983. arXiv:astro-ph/0605036. Bibcode:2006ApJ...647..970L. doi:10.1086/505573. S2CID 119482186. (over 400 citations)
- Cole, Andrew A.; Skillman, Evan D.; Tolstoy, Eline; Gallagher Iii, John S.; Aparicio, Antonio; Dolphin, Andrew E.; Gallart, Carme; Hidalgo, Sebastian L.; Saha, Abhijit; Stetson, Peter B.; Weisz, Daniel R. (2007). "Leo A: A Late-blooming Survivor of the Epoch of Reionization in the Local Group". The Astrophysical Journal. 659 (1): L17–L20. arXiv:astro-ph/0702646. Bibcode:2007ApJ...659L..17C. doi:10.1086/516711. S2CID 14268757.
- Dale, D. A.; Cohen, S. A.; Johnson, L. C.; Schuster, M. D.; Calzetti, D.; Engelbracht, C. W.; Gil De Paz, A.; Kennicutt, R. C.; Lee, J. C.; Begum, A.; Block, M.; Dalcanton, J. J.; Funes, J. G.; Gordon, K. D.; Johnson, B. D.; Marble, A. R.; Sakai, S.; Skillman, E. D.; Van Zee, L.; Walter, F.; Weisz, D. R.; Williams, B.; Wu, S.-Y.; Wu, Y. (2009). "Thespitzerlocal Volume Legacy: Survey Description and Infrared Photometry". The Astrophysical Journal. 703 (1): 517–556. arXiv:0907.4722. Bibcode:2009ApJ...703..517D. doi:10.1088/0004-637X/703/1/517. S2CID 51119114. (over 500 citations)
- Dalcanton, Julianne J.; Williams, Benjamin F.; Seth, Anil C.; Dolphin, Andrew; Holtzman, Jon; Rosema, Keith; Skillman, Evan D.; Cole, Andrew; Girardi, Léo; Gogarten, Stephanie M.; Karachentsev, Igor D.; Olsen, Knut; Weisz, Daniel; Christensen, Charlotte; Freeman, Ken; Gilbert, Karoline; Gallart, Carme; Harris, Jason; Hodge, Paul; De Jong, Roelof S.; Karachentseva, Valentina; Mateo, Mario; Stetson, Peter B.; Tavarez, Maritza; Zaritsky, Dennis; Governato, Fabio; Quinn, Thomas (2009). "The ACS Nearby Galaxy Survey Treasury". The Astrophysical Journal Supplement Series. 183 (1): 67–108. arXiv:0905.3737. Bibcode:2009ApJS..183...67D. doi:10.1088/0067-0049/183/1/67. S2CID 5032304. (over 500 citations)
- Aver, Erik; Olive, Keith A.; Skillman, Evan D. (2010). "A new approach to systematic uncertainties and self-consistency in helium abundance determinations". Journal of Cosmology and Astroparticle Physics. 2010 (5): 003. arXiv:1001.5218. Bibcode:2010JCAP...05..003A. doi:10.1088/1475-7516/2010/05/003. S2CID 250766602.
- Weisz, Daniel R.; Dalcanton, Julianne J.; Williams, Benjamin F.; Gilbert, Karoline M.; Skillman, Evan D.; Seth, Anil C.; Dolphin, Andrew E.; McQuinn, Kristen B. W.; Gogarten, Stephanie M.; Holtzman, Jon; Rosema, Keith; Cole, Andrew; Karachentsev, Igor D.; Zaritsky, Dennis (2011). "The ACS Nearby Galaxy Survey Treasury. Viii. The Global Star Formation Histories of 60 Dwarf Galaxies in the Local Volume". The Astrophysical Journal. 739 (1): 5. arXiv:1101.1093. Bibcode:2011ApJ...739....5W. doi:10.1088/0004-637X/739/1/5. S2CID 119230989.
- Berg, Danielle A.; Skillman, Evan D.; Marble, Andrew R.; Van Zee, Liese; Engelbracht, Charles W.; Lee, Janice C.; Kennicutt, Robert C.; Calzetti, Daniela; Dale, Daniel A.; Johnson, Benjamin D. (2012). "Direct Oxygen Abundances for Low-Luminosity LVL Galaxies". The Astrophysical Journal. 754 (2): 98. arXiv:1205.6782. Bibcode:2012ApJ...754...98B. doi:10.1088/0004-637X/754/2/98. hdl:2022/19103. S2CID 119290972.
- Weisz, Daniel R.; Dolphin, Andrew E.; Skillman, Evan D.; Holtzman, Jon; Gilbert, Karoline M.; Dalcanton, Julianne J.; Williams, Benjamin F. (2014). "The Star Formation Histories of Local Group Dwarf Galaxies. I.hubble Space Telescope/Wide Field Planetary Camera 2 Observations". The Astrophysical Journal. 789 (2): 147. arXiv:1404.7144. Bibcode:2014ApJ...789..147W. doi:10.1088/0004-637X/789/2/147. S2CID 119273716. (over 400 citations)
- Aver, Erik; Olive, Keith A.; Skillman, Evan D. (2015). "The effects of He I λ10830 on helium abundance determinations". Journal of Cosmology and Astroparticle Physics. 2015 (7): 011. arXiv:1503.08146. Bibcode:2015JCAP...07..011A. doi:10.1088/1475-7516/2015/07/011. S2CID 59467603.
- Fitts, Alex; Boylan-Kolchin, Michael; Elbert, Oliver D.; Bullock, James S.; Hopkins, Philip F.; Oñorbe, Jose; Wetzel, Andrew; Wheeler, Coral; Faucher-Giguère, Claude-André; Kereš, Dušan; Skillman, Evan D.; Weisz, Daniel R. (2017). "Fire in the field: Simulating the threshold of galaxy formation". Monthly Notices of the Royal Astronomical Society. 471 (3): 3547–3562. arXiv:1611.02281. doi:10.1093/mnras/stx1757.
- Berg, Danielle A.; Erb, Dawn K.; Henry, Richard B. C.; Skillman, Evan D.; McQuinn, Kristen B. W. (2019). "The Chemical Evolution of Carbon, Nitrogen, and Oxygen in Metal-poor Dwarf Galaxies". The Astrophysical Journal. 874 (1): 93. arXiv:1901.08160. Bibcode:2019ApJ...874...93B. doi:10.3847/1538-4357/ab020a. S2CID 102486209.
- Berg, Danielle A.; Pogge, Richard W.; Skillman, Evan D.; Croxall, Kevin V.; Moustakas, John; Rogers, Noah S. J.; Sun, Jiayi (2020). "CHAOS IV: Gas-phase Abundance Trends from the First Four CHAOS Galaxies". The Astrophysical Journal. 893 (2): 96. arXiv:2001.05002. Bibcode:2020ApJ...893...96B. doi:10.3847/1538-4357/ab7eab. S2CID 210718575.
- Aver, Erik; Berg, Danielle A.; Olive, Keith A.; Pogge, Richard W.; Salzer, John J.; Skillman, Evan D. (2021). "Improving helium abundance determinations with Leo P as a case study". Journal of Cosmology and Astroparticle Physics. 2021 (3): 027. arXiv:2010.04180. Bibcode:2021JCAP...03..027A. doi:10.1088/1475-7516/2021/03/027. S2CID 222271995.

=== Books ===
- Skillman, Evan David (1996). The Minnesota Lectures on Extragalactic Neutral Hydrogen: A Series of Lectures Presented at the University of Minnesota, Minneapolis, from 27 March 1994 to 2 June 1994. Astronomical Society of the Pacific Conference Series, volume 106. Astronomical Society of the Pacific. ISBN 1-886733-26-0. Skillman, Evan David (1996). e-book. Astronomical Society of the Pacific. ISBN 978-1-58381-442-0.
