= 1967 Menzel =

Stony main-belt asteroid

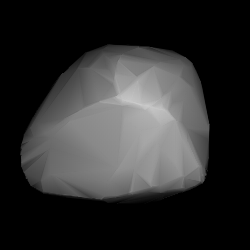
- Modelled shape of Menzel from its lightcurve

Discovery
- Discovered by: M. F. Wolf
- Discovery site: Heidelberg Obs.
- Discovery date: 1 November 1905

Designations
- Named after: Donald Menzel (American astrophysicist)
- Alternative designations: A905 VC · 1930 DS; 1965 SF · 1965 VH; 1970 EM · 1973 CE; 1975 UH · 1975 VE
- Minor planet category: main-belt · (inner)

Orbital characteristics
- Epoch 4 September 2017 (JD 2458000.5)
- Uncertainty parameter 0
- Observation arc: 111.50 yr (40,724 days)
- Aphelion: 2.5437 AU
- Perihelion: 1.9238 AU
- Semi-major axis: 2.2337 AU
- Eccentricity: 0.1388
- Orbital period (sidereal): 3.34 yr (1,219 days)
- Mean anomaly: 183.67°
- Mean motion: 0° 17^{m} 42.72^{s} / day
- Inclination: 3.9008°
- Longitude of ascending node: 57.801°
- Argument of perihelion: 347.83°

Physical characteristics
- Mean diameter: 9.588±0.181 km 10.138±0.092 km 10.18 km (taken); 10.182 km
- Synodic rotation period: 2.834±0.001 h 2.8343±0.0003 h (Note: Pravec (2010) web: rotation period 2.8343±0.0003 hours with a brightness amplitude of 0.25 mag. Summary figures for (1967) Menzel at Collaborative Asteroid Lightcurve Link (CALL) and Pravec, P.; Wolf, M.; Sarounova, L. (2010)); 2.8344±0.0002 h (Note: Pravec (2007) web: rotation period 2.8344±0.0002 hours with a brightness amplitude of 0.24 magnitude. Summary figures for (1967) Menzel at Collaborative Asteroid Lightcurve Link (CALL) and Pravec, P.; Wolf, M.; Sarounova, L. (2007)); 2.8346±0.0003 h 2.83481±0.00001 h 2.83497±0.00005 h 2.835±0.001 h 2.8350±0.0005 h 2.8364±0.0005 h 2.84±0.03 h
- Geometric albedo: 0.2145; 0.2279±0.0397; 0.251±0.070
- Spectral type: S
- Absolute magnitude (H): 11.76±0.03 (R) · 12.1 · 12.21 · 12.25±0.058 · 12.34±0.23

1967 Menzel (prov. designation: A905 VC) is a stony background asteroid from the inner regions of the asteroid belt, approximately 10 kilometers (6.2 miles) in diameter. It was discovered on 1 November 1905, by German astronomer Max Wolf at Heidelberg Observatory in southern Germany, and later named after American astrophysicist Donald Howard Menzel.

== Classification and orbit ==
Menzel is a stony S-type asteroid that orbits the Sun in the inner main-belt at a distance of 1.9–2.5 AU once every 3 years and 4 months (1,219 days). Its orbit has an eccentricity of 0.14 and an inclination of 4° with respect to the ecliptic. The body's observation arc begins with its first used observation at Goethe Link Observatory in 1965, or 60 years after its official discovery, with a number of unused observations previously made at Heidelberg.

== Naming ==
This minor planet was named after American astrophysicist Donald Howard Menzel (1901–1976), who was the director of the Harvard College Observatory and a pioneer in theoretical and observational astrophysics. Menzel, a mentor of several prolific astronomers, calculated Atomic Transition Probabilities, analysed the composition of stars from their spectra, studied the physics of gaseous nebulae and the Sun's chromosphere, observed solar eclipses, and measured the rotation period of Uranus and Neptune by means of spectroscopy. Menzel was also popular for debunking UFO sightings. The official naming citation was published by the Minor Planet Center on 18 April 1977 (M.P.C. 4158).

== Physical characteristics ==
Between September 2005 and November 2015, a total of least 10 rotational lightcurves were obtained for this asteroid from photometric observations from several observatories all over the world. They all gave a concurring, well-defined rotation period of 2.83–2.84 hours with a brightness variation between 0.24 and 0.39 magnitude.(U=3/3/3/3/3/3/3/3/2+/3).

According to the space-based survey carried out by the NEOWISE mission of NASA's Wide-field Infrared Survey Explorer, Menzel measures between 9.6 and 10.2 kilometers in diameter and its surface has an albedo between 0.21 and 0.25. The Collaborative Asteroid Lightcurve Link derives a typical albedo for stony asteroids of 0.21 and a diameter of 10.1 kilometers, with an absolute magnitude of 12.25.
