= 1620 Geographos =

Asteroid

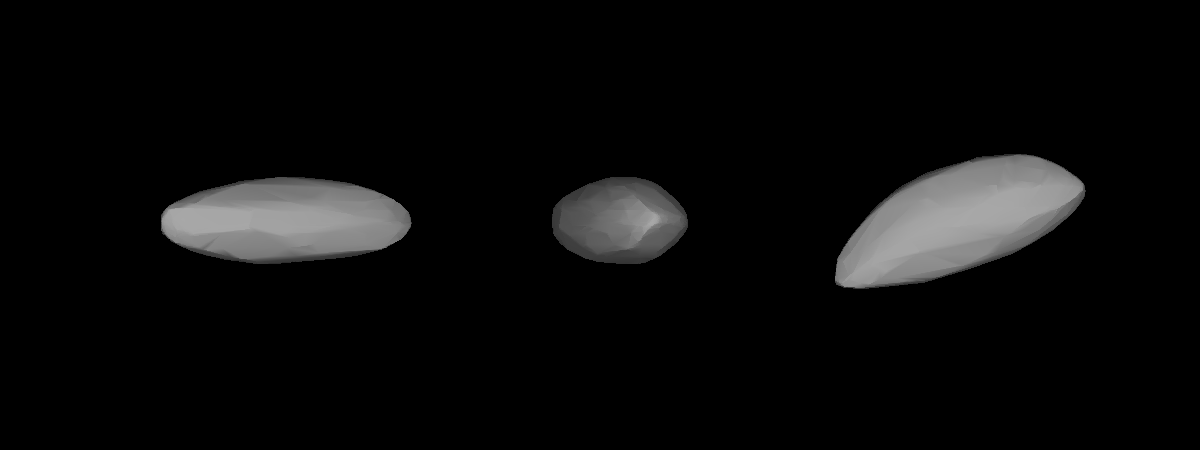
- Lightcurve-based 3D-model of Geographos

Discovery
- Discovered by: A. G. Wilson; R. Minkowski
- Discovery site: Palomar Observatory
- Discovery date: 14 September 1951

Designations
- Pronunciation: /dʒiːoʊˈɡræfɒs/
- Named after: National Geographic Society
- Alternative designations: 1951 RA · 1983 CY_{3}
- Minor planet category: Apollo · NEO · PHA

Orbital characteristics
- Epoch 4 September 2017 (JD 2458000.5)
- Uncertainty parameter 0
- Observation arc: 65.37 yr (23,875 days)
- Earliest precovery date: 31 August 1951
- Aphelion: 1.6629 AU
- Perihelion: 0.8276 AU
- Semi-major axis: 1.2453 AU
- Eccentricity: 0.3354
- Orbital period (sidereal): 1.39 yr (508 days)
- Mean anomaly: 246.00°
- Mean motion: 0° 42^{m} 33.48^{s} / day
- Inclination: 13.337°
- Longitude of ascending node: 337.20°
- Argument of perihelion: 276.90°
- Earth MOID: 0.0301 AU · 11.7 LD

Physical characteristics
- Dimensions: (5.0×2.0×2.1) ± 0.15 km
- Mean diameter: 1.77±0.1 km 1.87±0.05 km 1.96±0.06 km 2.5 km 2.56±0.15 km
- Synodic rotation period: 5.2220±0.0003 h 5.22204±0.00007 h (Note: Hamanowa (2011): lightcurve plot of (1620) Geographos, by H. & H. Hamanowa at the Hamanowa Astronomical Observatory (D91). Obs. date: 2008-02-10; rotation period 5.22204 hours (0.217585 days) with a brightness amplitude of 1.39 mag. Quality Code of 3. Summary figures at the LCDB); 5.22229±0.00004 h 5.223±0.003 h 5.223±0.005 h 5.223 h 5.223326 h 5.223327 h 5.223328 h 5.224±0.007 h
- Geometric albedo: 0.26; 0.290±0.038; 0.29±0.04; 0.32±0.04; 0.3258±0.051
- Spectral type: Tholen = S SMASS = S · S B–V = 0.862; B–V = 0.896±0.009; U–B = 0.471; V–R = 0.462±0.005; V–I = 0.816±0.006
- Absolute magnitude (H): 15.09 · 15.41 · 15.55±0.37 · 15.6

1620 Geographos (/dʒiːoʊˈɡræfɒs/; provisional designation 1951 RA) is a highly elongated, stony asteroid, near-Earth object and potentially hazardous asteroid of the Apollo group, with a mean diameter of approximately 2.5 km (1.6 mi). It was discovered on 14 September 1951, by astronomers Albert George Wilson and Rudolph Minkowski at the Palomar Observatory in California, United States. The asteroid was named in honor of the National Geographic Society.

== Orbit and classification ==
Animation of 1620 Geographos's orbit 2010-2020 Sun · Venus · Earth · Mars · 1620 Geographos

Geographos orbits the Sun at a distance of 0.8–1.7 AU once every 1 years and 5 months (508 days). Its orbit has an eccentricity of 0.34 and an inclination of 13° with respect to the ecliptic. Its orbit is well-determined for the next several hundred years. Due to its high eccentricity, Geographos is also a Mars-crosser asteroid. The body's observation arc begins at Palomar, two weeks prior to its official discovery observation.

=== Close approaches ===
As a potentially hazardous asteroid, Geographos has a minimum orbital intersection distance (MOID) with Earth of less than 0.05 AU and a diameter of greater than 150 meters. The Earth-MOID is currently 0.0301 AU (4,500,000 km), which translates into 11.7 lunar distances. In 1994, Geographos made its closest approach to Earth in two centuries at 5.0 million km – which will not be bettered until 2586.

== Failed Clementine mission ==
Geographos was to be explored by the U.S.'s Clementine mission which was launched in January 1994. However, a malfunction in the spacecraft ended the mission before it could approach the asteroid.

== Physical characteristics ==
=== Spectral type ===
In the Tholen and SMASS classification, Geographos is an S-type asteroid. This means that it is highly reflective and composed of nickel-iron mixed with iron- and magnesium-silicates.

=== Rotation period ===
Since the 1970s, several rotational lightcurve of Geographos have been obtained from photometric observations. Lightcurve analysis gave a rotation period (retrograde sense of rotation) between 5.222 and 5.224 hours with a very high brightness variation between 1.02 and 2.03 magnitude (U=3/3/3/2/3/3/3).

The Yarkovsky effect is causing a decrease in the orbital semimajor axis of 27.4±5.7 m yr^{−1}, while the YORP effect is increasing the asteroid's rotation at the rate of (1.14±0.03)×10^{−3} rad yr^{−2}.

=== Spin axis ===
Several lightcurve were also modeled from the abundant photometric observations. In 1994 and 1995, Polish astronomers obtained a concurring period 5.223328 hours and found a spin axis of (54.0°, −52.0°) in ecliptic coordinates (λ, β) (Q=3/3). Radiometric observations gave a period of 5.223327 hours and a pole of (55.0°, −46.0°). Two other international studies obtained a period of 5.223326 hours and a pole at (56.0°, −47.0°) and (55.0°, −45.0°), respectively (Q=3/3).

=== Shape and structure ===
The light curve shows a high amplitude, indicative of its elongated shape, measuring 5.0×2.0×2.1 kilometers, which corresponds to a mean-diameter of 2.5 km.

The interior of the asteroid probably has a rubble-pile structure. The asteroid's high thermal inertia indicates the surface is most likely a mix of fine grains and large rocks and boulders. During the asteroid's close approach to Earth in 1994, a radar study of it was conducted by the Deep Space Network at the Goldstone Observatory, California. The resultant images show Geographos to be the most elongated object in the Solar System.

=== Diameter and albedo ===
According to the observations with the Goldstone Observatory and the space-based surveys carried out by the Infrared Astronomical Satellite IRAS and the NEOWISE mission of the Wide-field Infrared Survey Explorer, Geographos measures between 1.77 and 2.56 kilometers in diameter and its surface has an albedo between 0.26 and 0.3258. The Collaborative Asteroid Lightcurve Link adopts an albedo of 0.26 and a diameter of 2.5 kilometers based on an absolute magnitude of 15.09.

== Naming ==
This minor planet was named after the National Geographic Society, in recognition of its contribution to astronomy by supporting the National Geographic Society – Palomar Observatory Sky Survey (NGS-POSS), which produced a photographic atlas of the entire northern sky in the 1950s. NGS-POSS was headed by the second discoverer, Rudolph Minkowski. The Greek word geographos means geographer (from geo– 'Earth' + graphos 'drawer/writer'). The official naming citation was published by the Minor Planet Center in August 1956 (M.P.C. 1468).

Model recreated from Radar images of Geographos
