= Menzel (crater) =

Crater on the Moon

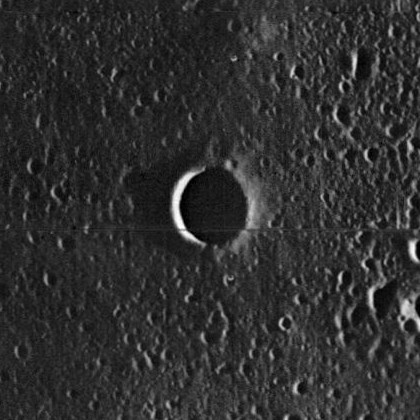
- Lunar Orbiter 1 image
- Coordinates: 3.4°N 36.9°E
- Diameter: 3 km
- Colongitude: 323° at sunrise
- Eponym: Donald H. Menzel

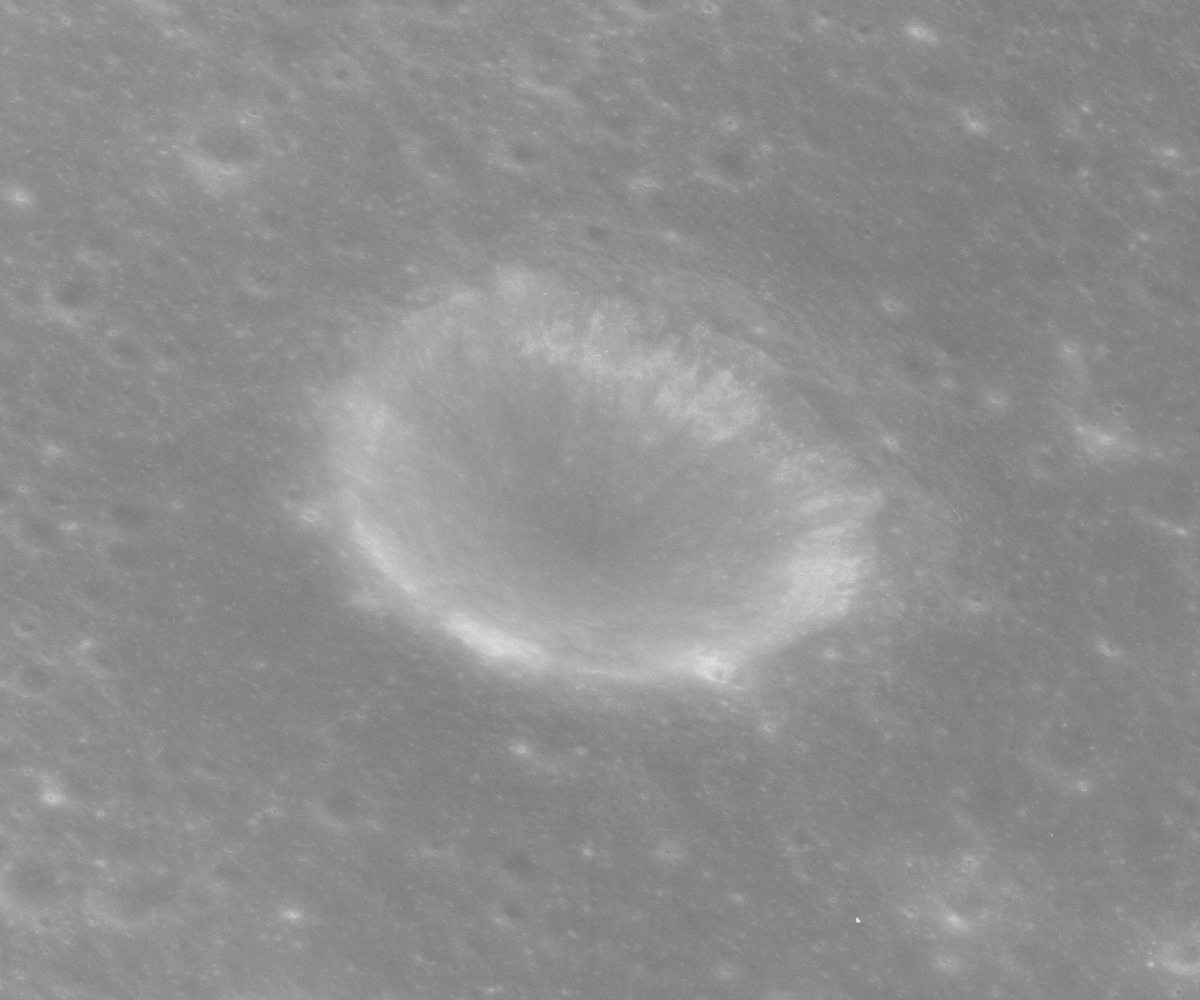
Oblique Apollo 15 image

Menzel is a tiny lunar impact crater located in the southeast of the Mare Tranquillitatis. It was named after American astrophysicist Donald H. Menzel. This feature is circular in outline and cup-shaped, with no overlapping impacts of significance. The mare around the crater is nearly devoid of features of interest, except for a nearly submerged crater rim to the northwest, and a few small rises to the north and east.
