= DR 21 =

Bipolar outflow in the constellation Cygnus

Molecular cloud
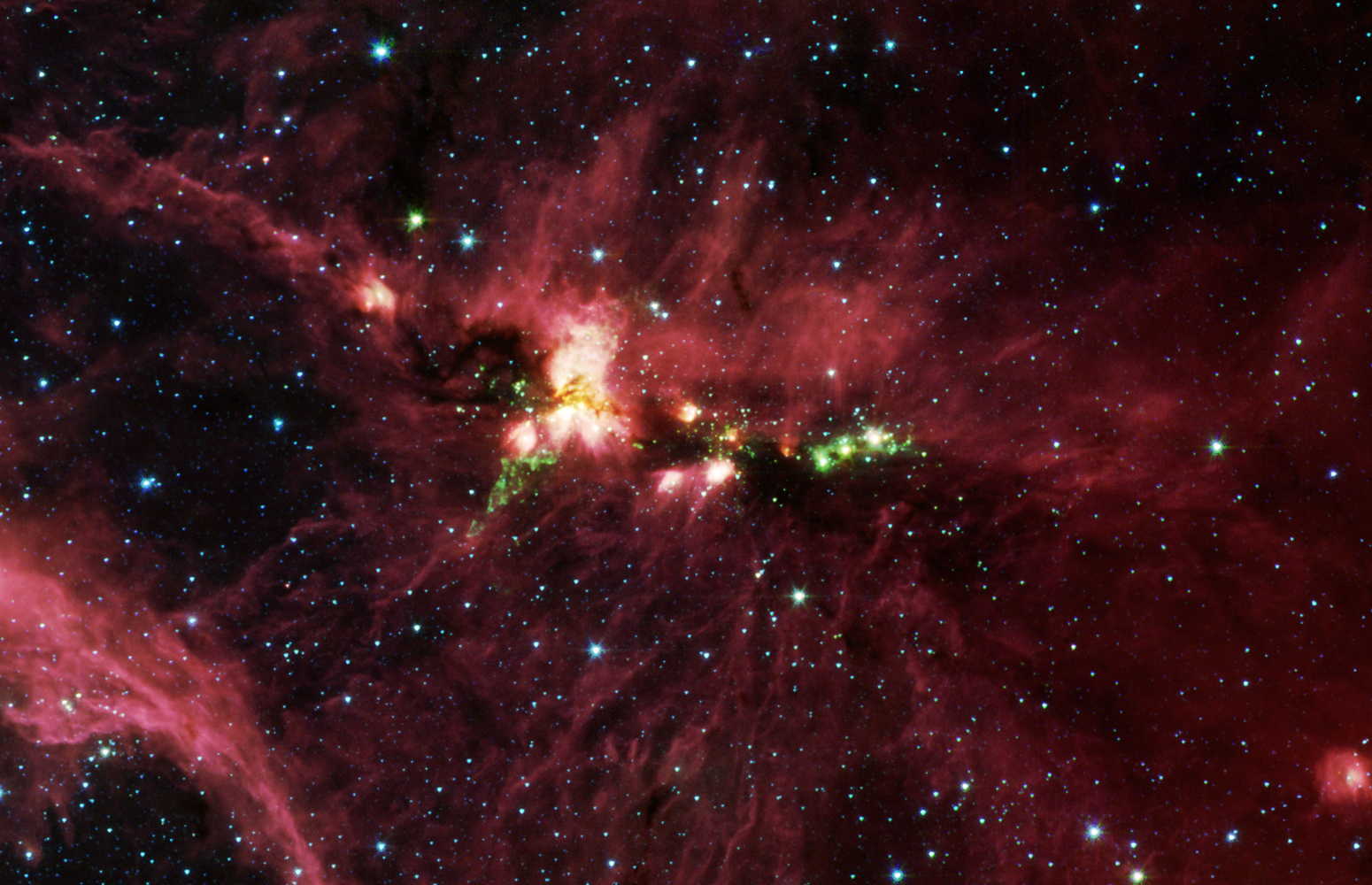
- Infrared view of the DR 21 molecular cloud

Observation data: J2000 epoch
- Subtype: Emission nebula
- Right ascension: 20^{h} 39^{m} 01.6^{s}
- Declination: +42° 19′ 38″
- Distance: 6,000 ly (1,800 pc)
- Constellation: Cygnus
- Designations: GRS G081.70 +00.50, GAL 081.681+00.54, W 75, 18P 78, 36P 19, RAFGL 2624

DR 21 is a large molecular cloud located in the constellation Cygnus, discovered in 1966 as a radio continuum source by Downes and Rinehart. DR 21 is located about 6,000 light-years (1,800 pc) from Earth and extends for 80 light-years (25 pc). The region contains a high rate of star formation and is associated with the Cygnus X star forming region. It has an estimated mass of 1,000,000 M_{☉}.

A number of different molecules have been detected in the region by their radio emission, including formaldehyde, ammonia, water and carbon monoxide.

In this region, some of the most massive stars in the Milky Way have been observed. DR 21 contains complex patterns of dust and gas, which glow in the infrared due to the presence of organic compounds known as polycyclic aromatic hydrocarbons. Jagged patterns within DR 21 result from interactions with interstellar wind, radiation pressure, magnetic fields, and gravity.

An estimated population of 2,900 stars have been formed in this molecular cloud, similar to the population of the Orion Nebula cluster, which are distributed in groups associated with cloud clumps. Feedback from the massive stars may ultimately disrupt the cloud, however this has not yet happened due to the region's extreme youth. Study of these stars by the Spitzer Space Telescope has shown signs of protoplanetary disks.
