= M2-9 =

Planetary nebula

Minkowski 2-9 (M2-9)
Emission nebula
- Planetary nebula
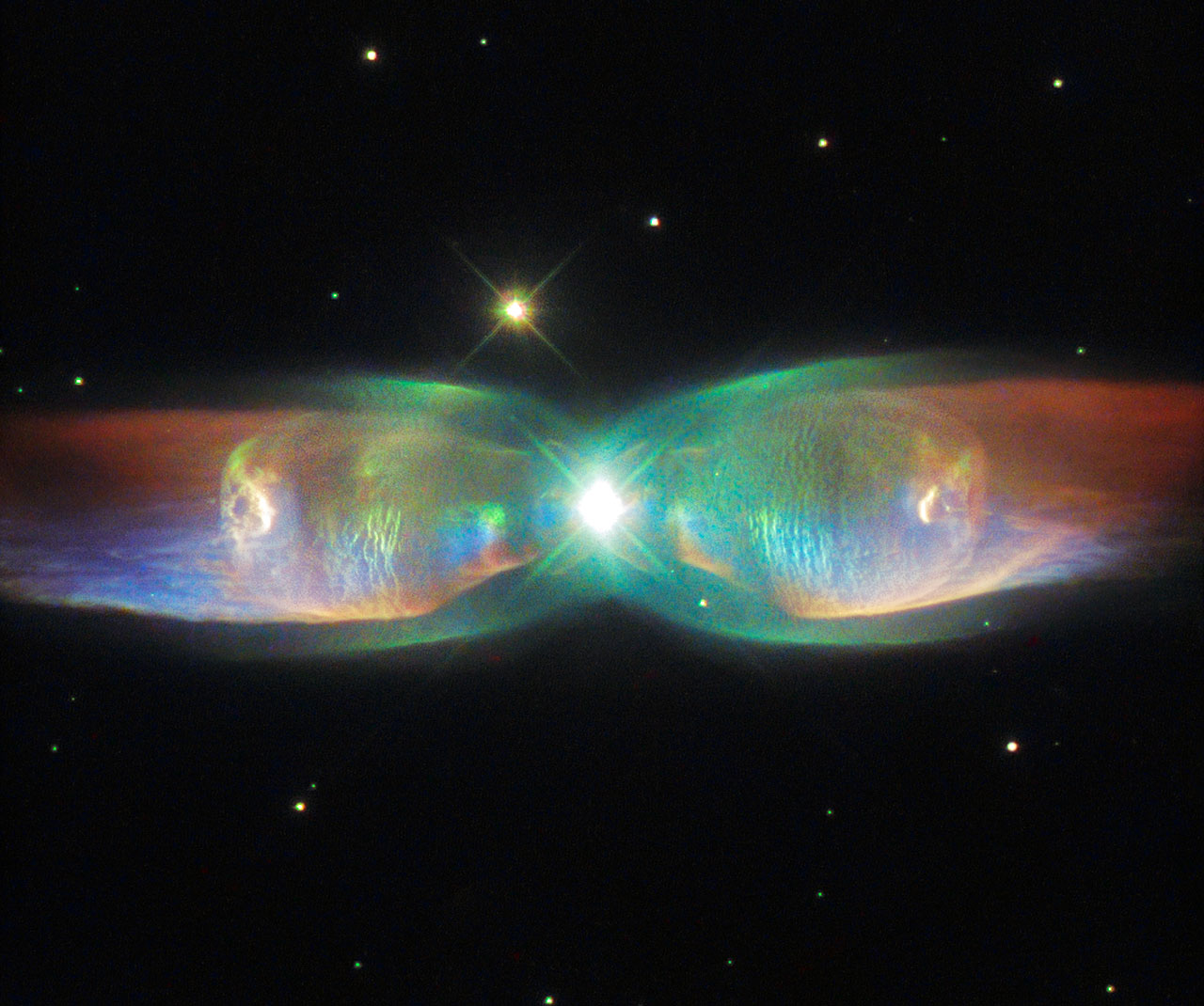
- M2-9 as taken by the Hubble Space Telescope

Observation data: J2000 epoch
- Right ascension: 17^{h} 05^{m} 37.952^{s}
- Declination: −10° 08′ 34.58″
- Distance: 2,100 ly (650 pc) ly
- Apparent magnitude (V): 14.7
- Apparent dimensions (V): 115″ × 18″
- Constellation: Ophiuchus

Physical characteristics
- Radius: 0.7 ly (0.2 pc) (Note: Radius = distance × sin(angular size / 2) = 2.1 kly * sin(115″ / 2) = 0.6 ly) ly
- Notable features: Bipolar outflow, Bipolar nebula
- Designations: Twin Jet Nebula, Butterfly Nebula, PNG 010.8+18.0 PK 010+18.2

Minkowski 2-9, abbreviated M2-9 (also known as Minkowski's Butterfly, Twin Jet Nebula or the Wings of a Butterfly Nebula) is a planetary nebula that is located about 2,100 light-years away from Earth in the direction of the constellation Ophiuchus. It was discovered by Rudolph Minkowski in 1947. This bipolar nebula takes the peculiar form of twin lobes of material that emanate from a central star. Astronomers have dubbed this object as the Twin Jet Nebula because of the jets believed to cause the shape of the lobes. Its form also resembles the wings of a butterfly. The nebula was imaged by the Hubble Space Telescope in the 1990s.

The primary component of the central binary is the hot core of a star that reached the end of its main-sequence life cycle, ejected most of its outer layers and became a red giant, and is now contracting into a white dwarf. It is believed to have been a sun-like star early in its life. The second, smaller star of the binary orbits very closely and may even have been engulfed by the other's expanding stellar atmosphere with the resulting interaction creating the nebula. Astronomers theorize that the gravity of one star pulls some of the gas from the surface of the other and flings it into a thin, dense disk extending into space. As the central binary orbits with a period of about 86 to 120 years, the wind emitting from the binary changes direction with it.

The nebula has inflated dramatically due to a fast stellar wind, blowing out into the surrounding disk and inflating the large, wispy hourglass-shaped wings perpendicular to the disk. These wings produce the butterfly appearance when seen in projection. The outer shell is estimated to be about 1,200 years old (Schwarz et al. 1997).

== See also ==
- List of planetary nebulae
