= NGC 2022 =

Planetary nebula in the constellation Orion

Emission nebula
- Planetary nebula
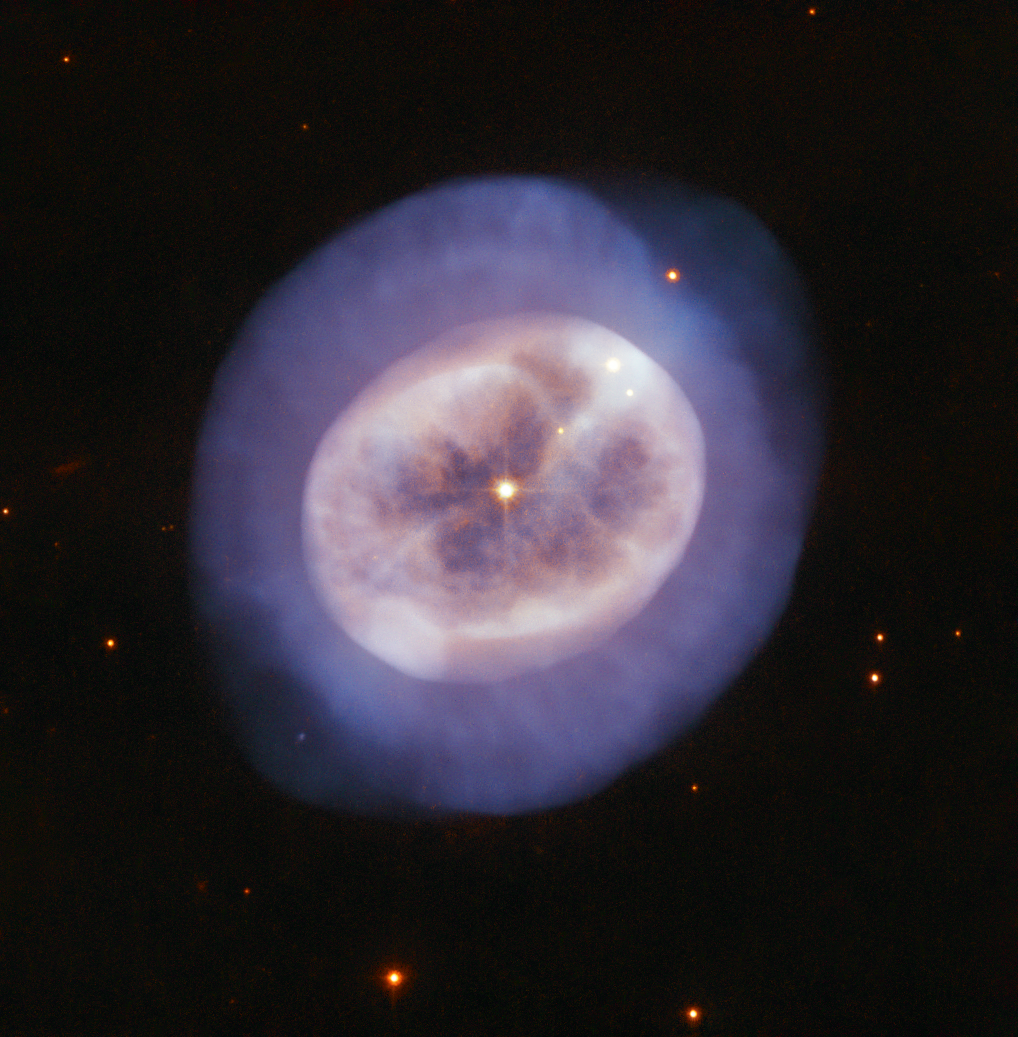
- NGC 2022 taken by HST.

Observation data: J2000 epoch
- Right ascension: 05^{h} 42^{m} 06.19056^{s}
- Declination: +09° 05′ 10.5843″
- Distance: 8.21 kly (2.518 kpc) ly
- Apparent magnitude (V): 11.6
- Apparent dimensions (V): 28″
- Constellation: Orion

Physical characteristics
- Radius: 0.326 ± 0.039 ly ly
- Notable features: Double-shell
- Designations: PK 196-10 1, IRAS 05393+0903

NGC 2022, also known as the Collarbone Nebula or Kissing Crescents Nebula, is a planetary nebula in the equatorial constellation of Orion, located at a distance of 8.21 kilolight-years from the Sun. It was first observed by William Herschel on December 28, 1785, who described it as: considerably bright, nearly round, like a star with a large diameter, like an ill-defined planetary nebula. In medium-sized amateur telescopes it looks like a small grayish patch of light. It is not very bright but it is still easy to spot it in the eyepiece. Even in a telescope as small as 80mm it can just be seen using a narrowband filter such as an OIII filter as a 'fuzzy' star. The object has the shape of a prolate spheroid with a major to minor axis ratio of 1.2, an apparent size of 28″, and a halo extending out to 40″, which is about the angular diameter of Jupiter as seen from Earth.

This is a double-shell planetary nebula with a wind-compressed inner shell and a more nebulous second shell. The linear radius of the inner shell is estimated at 0.326 ± 0.039 ly. It is expanding with a velocity of 28±2 km/s. The second shell is nearly circular and is expanding more slowly than the inner. The mass of the ionized elements in the planetary nebula is 0.19 M_{☉}, or 19% of the Sun's mass. A faint outer halo consists of the remains of material ejected during the central star's asymptotic giant branch stage.

NGC 2022 lies 11° away from the Galactic Plane, which position suggests it was formed from a low-mass star. The elemental abundances are similar to those in the Sun, although carbon is about 50% higher and sulfur is a factor of two lower. The central star of this nebula has a visual magnitude of 15.92, a temperature of 122,000 K, and is radiating 852 times the luminosity of the Sun from a photosphere that has only 6.55% of the Sun's radius.

== Gallery ==
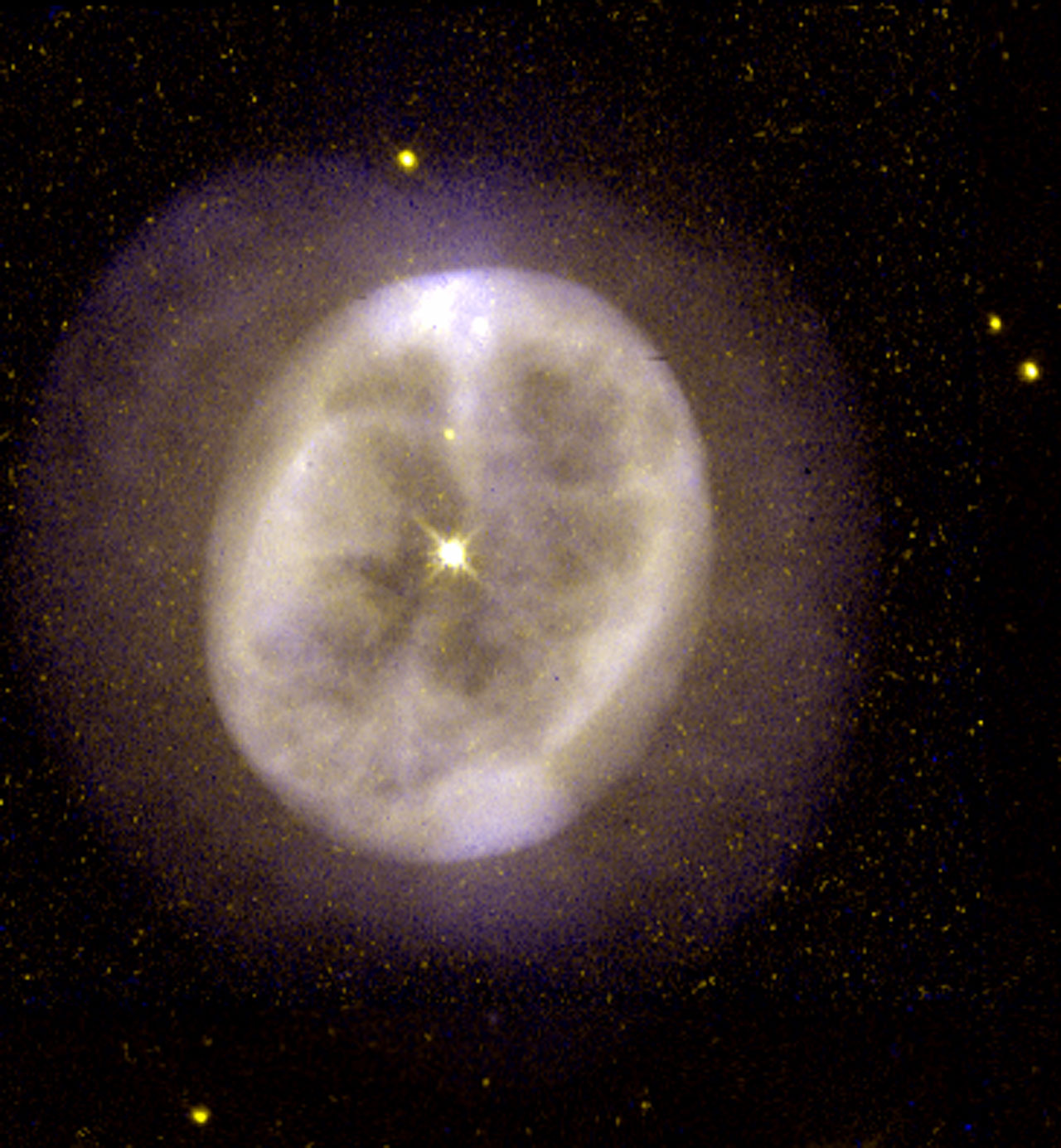
A Hubble Space Telescope (HST) image of NGC 2022. Credit: HST/NASA/ESA.

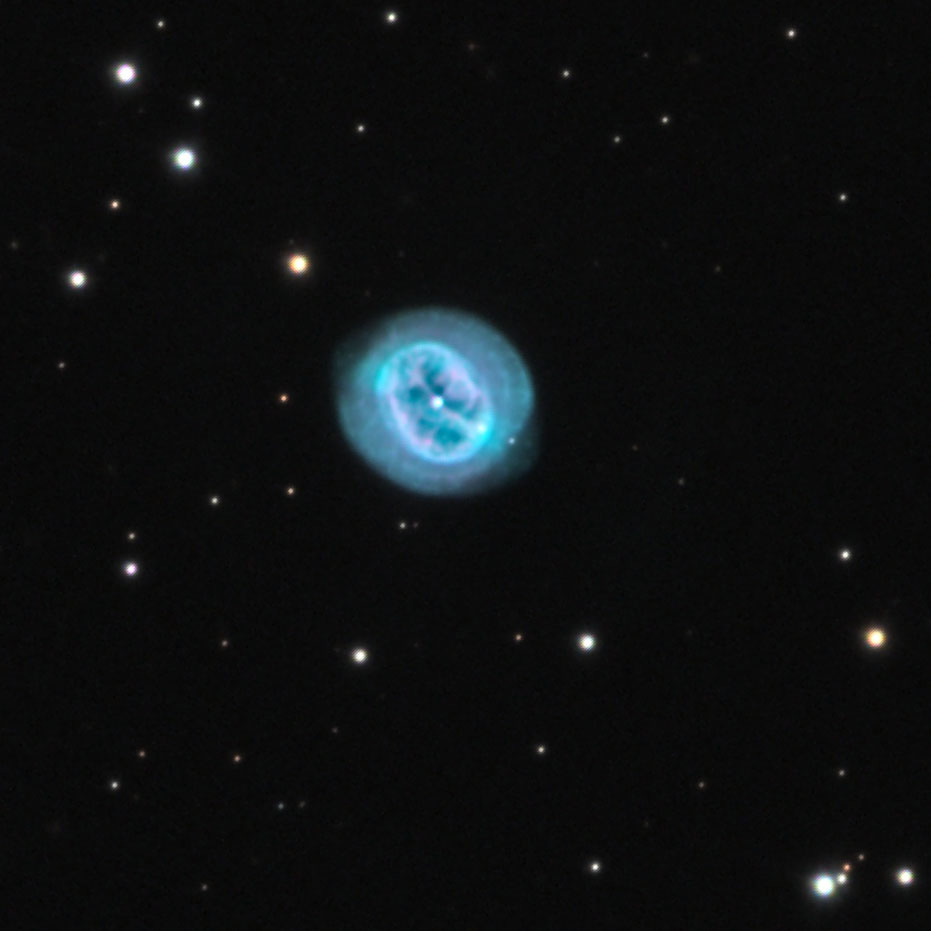
NGC 2022 taken at the Mount Lemmon SkyCenter (Tucson, AZ) using the 0.8m Schulman Telescope. Image courtesy Adam Block.
