= Hubble 12 =

Planetary nebula in the constellation Cassiopeia

Hb 12
Emission nebula
- Planetary nebula
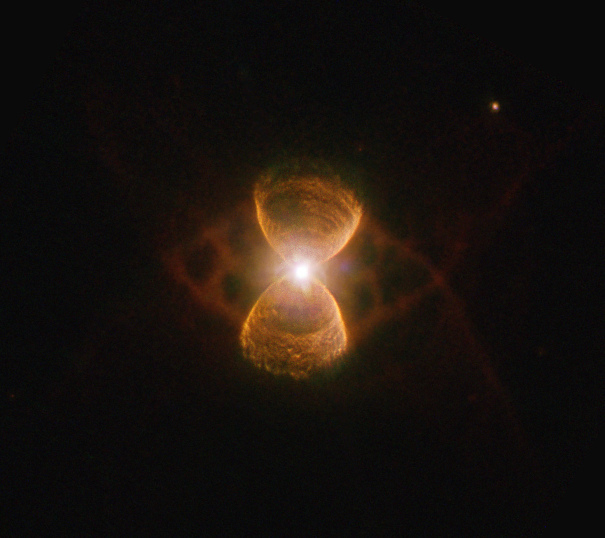
- Infrared image by the Hubble Space Telescope

Observation data: J2000 epoch
- Right ascension: 23^{h} 26^{m} 14.82^{s}
- Declination: 58° 10′ 54.65″
- Distance: 7,305-46,477 ly
- Apparent diameter: ~10"
- Constellation: Cassiopeia
- Designations: PN G111.8-02.8

Hubble 12 (Hb 12) or the Matryoshka Nebula is a bipolar planetary nebula (PN) with an hourglass like shape and has three pairs of bipolar lobes. Hb 12 was discovered by American astronomer Edwin Hubble in 1921.

Hb 12 has three pairs of bipolar lobes with a faint Hα arc filament. The outermost lobe is fainter on the eastern side than on the western side, which indicates less dense regions on the eastern side of the PN. The distance of Hb 12 is estimated to be ~2.24 kpc to ~14.25 kpc. The zone with a high electron density of ~5x10⁵ cm⁻³ corresponds to an electron temperature of ~13,600 K. A shocked Fe II line was found near the core of the bipolar structure.

== Central Star ==
Central star of Hb 12 has an estimated temperature of ~35,000 K and a luminosity of ~1200 L_{☉}. The appearance of highly structured bipolar lobes with two pairs of H² knots suggests that multiple pulsed mass-loss episodes have occurred during the AGB or post-AGB phases.
