= NGC 6302 =

Bipolar planetary nebula in the constellation Scorpius

Emission nebula
- Planetary nebula
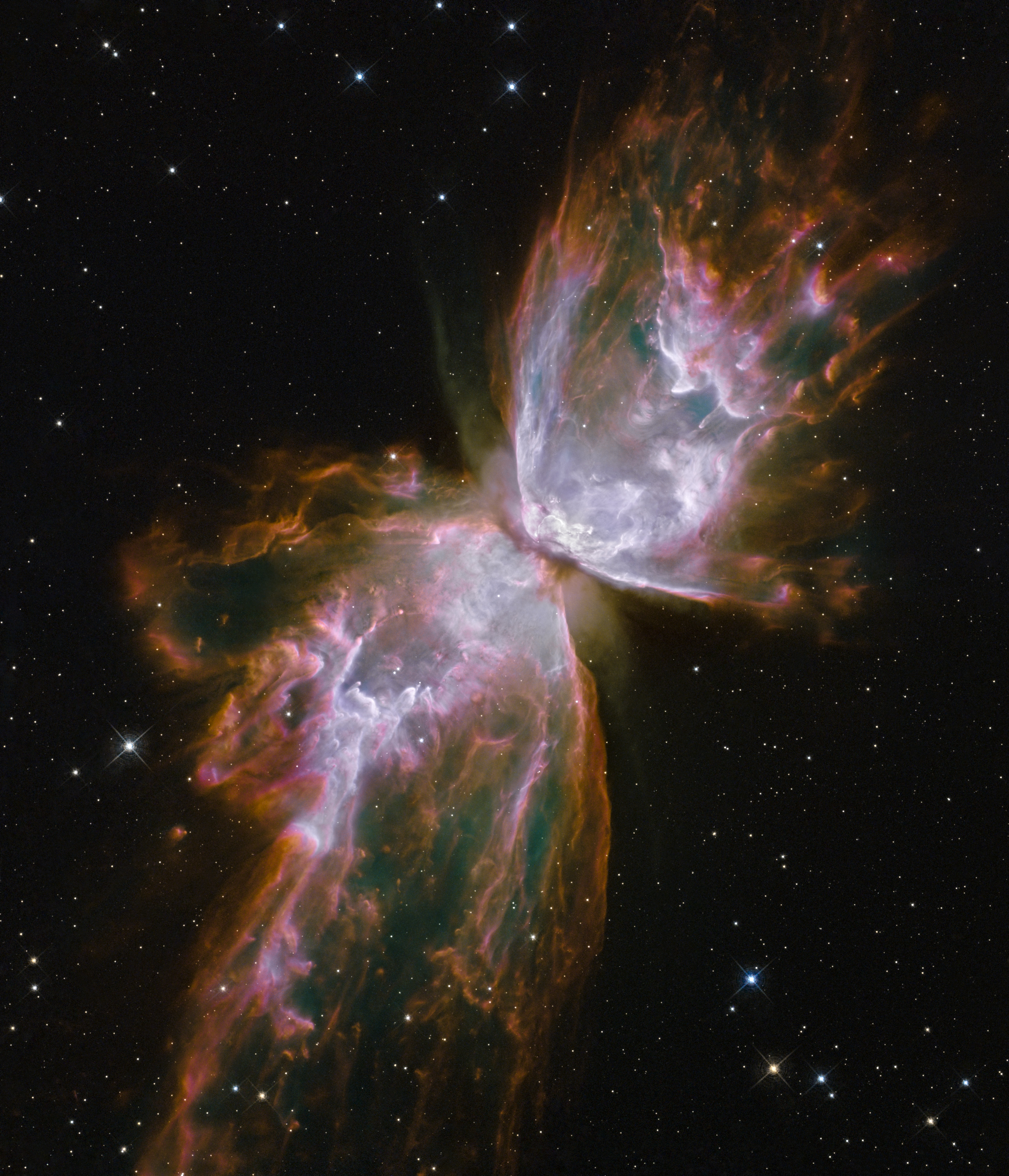
- NGC 6302, as taken by Hubble Space Telescope

Observation data: J2000 epoch
- Right ascension: 17^{h} 13^{m} 44.211^{s}
- Declination: −37° 06′ 15.94″
- Distance: 3400 ± 500 ly (1040 ± 160 pc)
- Apparent magnitude (V): 7.1B
- Apparent dimensions (V): >3′.0
- Constellation: Scorpius

Physical characteristics
- Radius: >1.5 ± 0.2 ly ly
- Absolute magnitude (V): -3.0B ^{+0.4}_{−0.3}
- Notable features: Dual chemistry, hot central star
- Designations: Bipolar Nebula, Bug Nebula, PK 349+01 1, Butterfly Nebula, Sharpless 6, RCW 124, Gum 60, Caldwell 69

NGC 6302 (also known as the Bug Nebula, Butterfly Nebula, or Caldwell 69) is a bipolar type planetary nebula in the constellation Scorpius. The structure in this planetary nebula is among the most complex ever seen in any planetary nebulae. The spectrum of Butterfly Nebula shows that its central star is one of the hottest stars known, with a surface temperature in excess of 250,000 degrees Celsius. This implies that the star from which it formed must have been very large in order to become this hot.

The central star, a white dwarf, was identified in 2009, using the upgraded Wide Field Camera 3 on board the Hubble Space Telescope. The star has a current mass of around 0.64 solar masses. The star is surrounded by a dense equatorial disc composed of gas and dust. This dense disc is postulated to have caused the star's outflows to form the bipolar structure seen in the Nebula. similar to an hourglass. This bipolar structure shows features such as ionization walls, knots and sharp edges to the lobes.

== Observation history ==
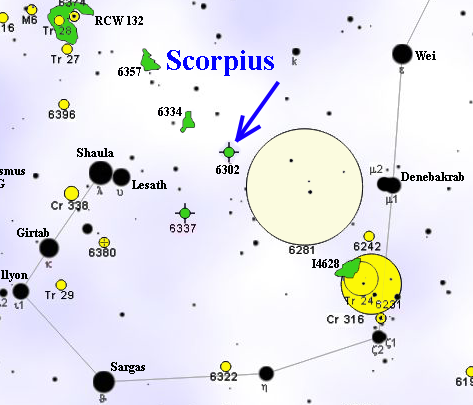
Position of NGC 6302

As it is included in the New General Catalogue, this object has been known since at least 1888. The earliest-known study of NGC 6302 is by Edward Emerson Barnard, who drew and described it in 1907.

The nebula featured in some of the first images released after the final servicing mission of the Hubble Space Telescope in September 2009.

== Characteristics ==
NGC 6302 imaged by the Gemini South telescope in hydrogen-alpha (red) and [O III] (blue) filters, showing the bipolar lobes and dark equatorial lane.

NGC 6302 has a complex structure, which may be approximated as bipolar with two primary lobes, though there is evidence for a second pair of lobes that may have belonged to a previous phase of mass loss. A dark lane runs through the waist of the nebula obscuring the central star at all wavelengths.

In their search for outer halo structures around type I PNe, Hua et al (1997) outlined several components in H alpha (figs. a), [NII] (b), [OIII] (c) & [SII]6717 (d). See Hua, 1997, A&AS 125, 355; Hua et al., 1998, A&AS, 133.

Four monochromatic images of NGC 6302 showing its emission structures.

NGC 6302. The blue line indicates the position of the 2.3-m telescope spectrographic slit.

The nebula contains a prominent northwest lobe which extends up to 3.0′ away from the central star and is estimated to have formed from an eruptive event around 1,900 years ago. It has a circular part whose walls are expanding such that each part has a speed proportional to its distance from the central star. At an angular distance of 1.71′ from the central star, the flow velocity of this lobe is measured to be 263 km/s. At the extreme periphery of the lobe, the outward velocity exceeds 600 km/s. The western edge of the lobe displays characteristics suggestive of a collision with pre-existing globules of gas which modified the outflow in that region.

== Central star ==
The central star, among the hottest stars known, had escaped detection because of a combination of its high temperature (meaning that it radiates mainly in the ultraviolet), the dusty torus (which absorbs a large fraction of the light from the central regions, especially in the ultraviolet) and the bright background from the star. It was not seen in the first Hubble Space Telescope images; the improved resolution and sensitivity of the new Wide Field Camera 3 of the same telescope later revealed the faint star at the centre. A temperature of 200,000 Kelvin is indicated, and a mass of 0.64 solar masses. The original mass of the star was around five solar masses and would have been a B type main sequence star on the main sequence, likely a B5-9V, but most of its mass was ejected in the event which created the planetary nebula. The luminosity and temperature of the star indicate it has ceased nuclear burning and is on its way to becoming a white dwarf, fading at a predicted rate of 1% per year.

== Dust chemistry ==
The prominent dark lane that runs through the centre of the nebula has been shown to have an unusual composition, showing evidence for multiple crystalline silicates, crystalline water ice and quartz, with other features which have been interpreted as the first extra-solar detection of carbonates. This detection has been disputed, due to the difficulties in forming carbonates in a non-aqueous environment. The dispute remains unresolved.

One of the characteristics of the dust detected in NGC 6302 is the existence of both oxygen-bearing silicate molecules and carbon-bearing polycyclic aromatic hydrocarbons (PAHs). Stars are usually either oxygen-rich or carbon-rich, the change from the former to the latter occurring late in the evolution of the star due to nuclear and chemical changes in the star's atmosphere. NGC 6302 belongs to a group of objects where hydrocarbon molecules formed in an oxygen-rich environment.

== See also ==
- List of largest nebulae
- Lists of nebulae
