= Bruce Balick =

American astronomer

Bruce Balick (born March 8, 1943) is an American astronomer and radio astronomer.

Balick grew up in Washington, Philadelphia and in Wilmette, Illinois, where he graduated from New Trier High School in 1961. He then studied physics at Beloit College in Wisconsin, earning a bachelor's degree, and received his doctorate in 1971 from Cornell University under Robert Hjellming. He primarily works at the University of Washington since 1975, where he is now professor emeritus. For a time, he directed the astronomy department.

In 1974, he discovered Sagittarius A with Robert L. Brown using the interferometer at the National Radio Astronomy Observatory (NRAO), where he first attended summer courses in 1968/69. He conducts research on planetary nebulae, the final stages of most stars in the galaxy (including the Sun), and on the origin of their frequently occurring symmetries (despite their fundamental asymmetry) using (magneto-) hydrodynamic modelling of matter ejection and their chemical composition (element frequencies).

He also uses optical telescopes and the Hubble Space Telescope and was part of the design team for its Wide Field Camera 3 (WFC3).

He is a Fellow of the American Association for the Advancement of Science and was a member of URSI Commission J (Radio Astronomy).
