= Hubble 5 =

Planetary nebula in the constellation Sagittarius

Hb 5
Emission nebula
- Planetary nebula
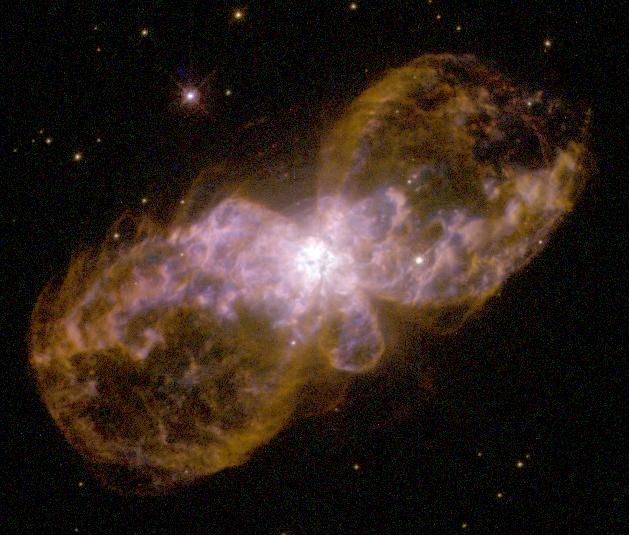
- Image of Hb 5 from the Hubble Space Telescope

Observation data: J2000 epoch
- Right ascension: 17^{h} 47^{m} 56.25^{s}
- Declination: −29° 59′ 40.07″
- Apparent diameter: 52" x 18"
- Constellation: Sagittarius
- Designations: PK 359.3-00.1, Hen 2-286, PN G359-3.3-00.9, Sa 2-244, BI 1-E

Hubble 5 (Hb 5) is a large bipolar planetary nebula (PN) with a complex shape. The nebula was discovered by American astronomer Edwin Hubble in 1921.

The nebula is a bipolar, point-symmetric PN with complex shapes. Hb 5 has an estimated size of 52" x 18" in Hα. The distance of Hb 5 remains uncertain, with estimates ranging between 0.7 kpc and 2 kpc. The electron temperature of the nebula is 13,000K-16,000K based on the Ne III temperature being lower than the Ne V temperature. The Hβ flux is ~3.0 x 10-12 erg cm⁻² s⁻¹ or 1.19 x 10-10 erg cm⁻² s⁻¹.

== Central star ==
Central star is very faint and has an Ne VI line that proves that the star is quite hot. The star has a zanstra temperature ranging from ~100,000 K for hydrogen to ~130,000 K for helium II. The star has a radius of about ~0.17 R_{☉} and a luminosity of 2 x 10⁴ L_{ʘ}.
