= NGC 2346 =

Planetary nebula in the constellation Monoceros

Emission nebula
- Planetary nebula
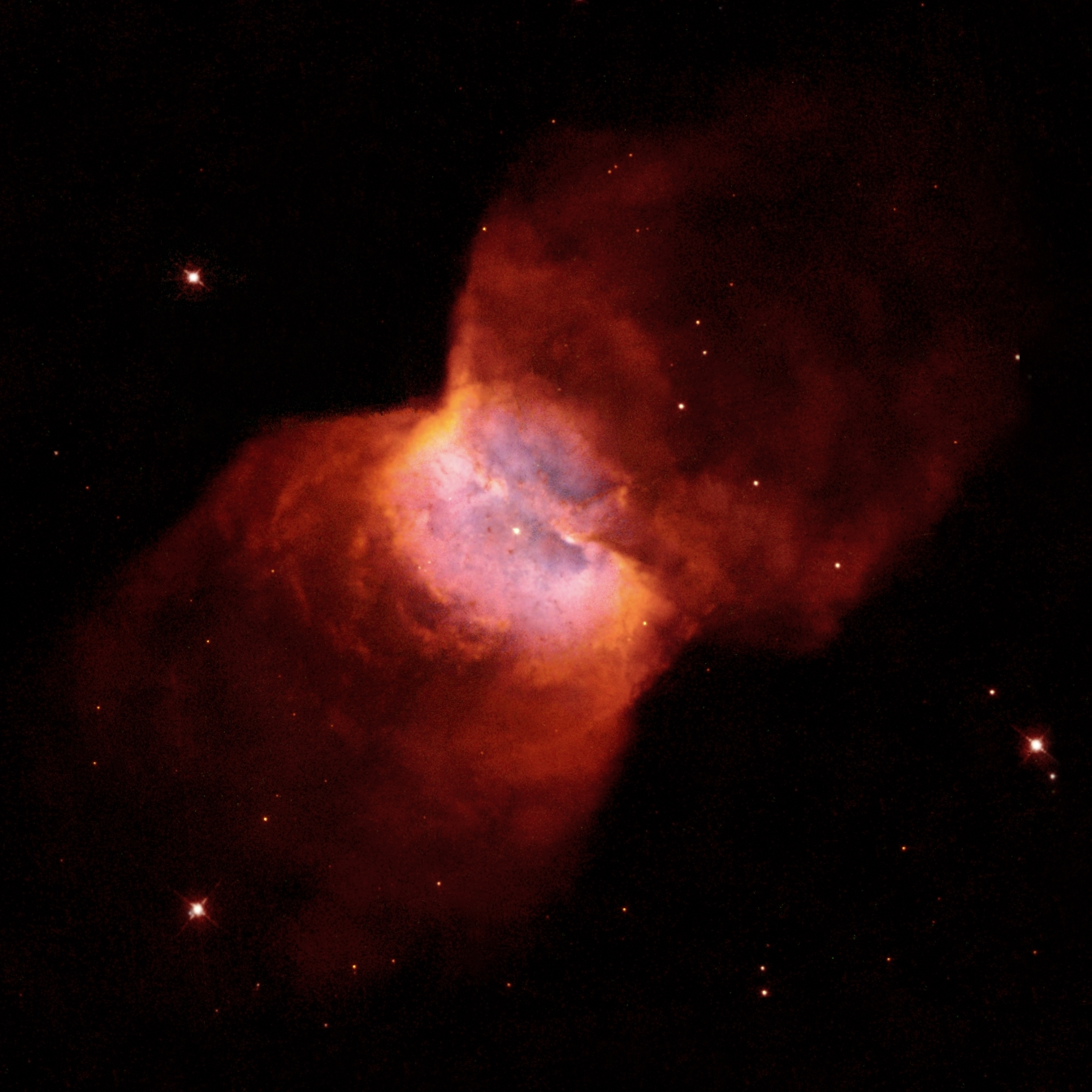
- NGC 2346 imaged by the Hubble Space Telescope

Observation data: J2000.0 epoch
- Right ascension: 07^{h} 09^{m} 22.52166^{s}
- Declination: −00° 48′ 23.6112″
- Distance: 4,760 ly (1,458 pc) ly
- Apparent magnitude (V): 9.6
- Apparent dimensions (V): 0.91′
- Constellation: Monoceros

Physical characteristics
- Radius: 2 ly
- Designations: Butterfly Nebula, Bug Nebula

NGC 2346, also known as the Crimson Butterfly Nebula, is a planetary nebula near the celestial equator in the constellation of Monoceros, less than a degree to the ESE of Delta Monocerotis. It is informally known as the Butterfly Nebula. The nebula is bright and conspicuous with a visual magnitude of 9.6, and has been extensively studied. Among its most remarkable characteristics is its unusually cool central star, which is a spectroscopic binary, and its unusual shape.

The nebular is bipolar in form, with modest outflow velocities in the range of 8–11 km/s, while the center is girded by an expanding belt of molecular gas. The electron density of the nebula is on the order of 400 per cubic centimeter. The ionization of the nebula is the result of ultraviolet emission from the binary companion. The stronger infrared emission from molecular emission is coming from the belt, which is expanding at the rate of 16 km/s. The mass of the molecular gas in the nebula is estimated to be in the range of 0.34–1.85 M_{☉}, and is much greater than the mass of the ionized gas.

The central star is a binary star consisting of an A-type subgiant and a subdwarf O star. The system, which has an orbital period of 16.00±0.03 days, is also variable, probably due to dust in orbit around it. The dust itself is heated by the central star and so NGC 2346 is unusually bright in the infrared part of the spectrum. When one of the two stars evolved into a red giant, it engulfed its companion, which stripped away a ring of material from the larger star's atmosphere. When the red giant's core was exposed, a fast stellar wind inflated two ‘bubbles’ from either side of the ring.

== Gallery ==
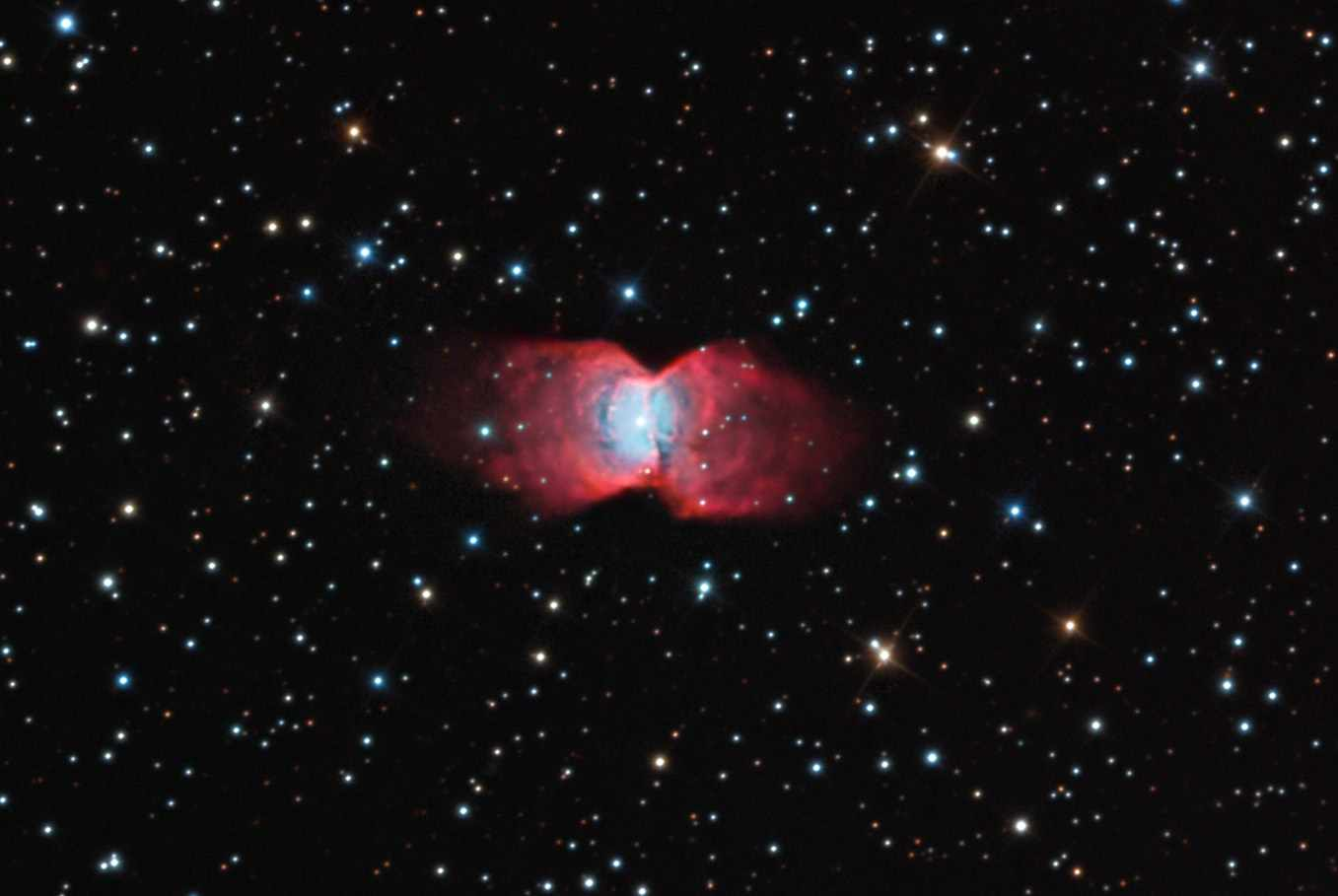
