= Bipolar outflow =

Two continuous flows of gas from the poles of a star

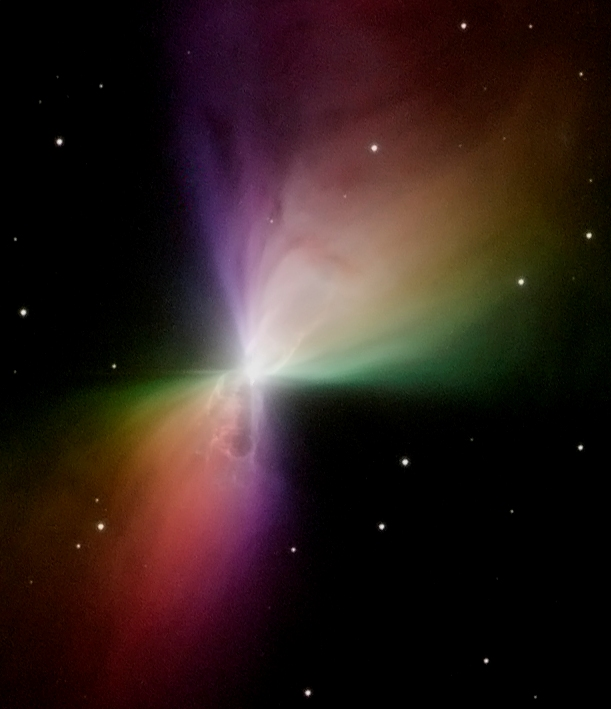
The Boomerang Nebula is an excellent example of a bipolar outflow.

A bipolar outflow comprises two continuous flows of gas from the poles of a star. Bipolar outflows may be associated with protostars (young, forming stars), or with evolved post-AGB stars (often in the form of bipolar nebulae).

== Protostars ==
In the case of a young star, the bipolar outflow is driven by a dense, collimated jet. These astrophysical jets are narrower than the outflow and very difficult to observe directly. However, supersonic shock fronts along the jet heat the gas in and around the jet to thousands of degrees. These pockets of hot gas radiate at infrared wavelengths and thus can be detected with telescopes like the United Kingdom Infrared Telescope (UKIRT). They often appear as discrete knots or arcs along the beam of the jet. They are usually called molecular bow shocks, since the knots are usually curved like the bow wave at the front of a ship.

== Occurrence ==
Typically, molecular bow shocks are observed in ro-vibrational emission from hot molecular hydrogen. These objects are known as molecular hydrogen emission-line objects, or MHOs.

Bipolar outflows are usually observed in emission from warm carbon monoxide molecules with millimeter-wave telescopes like the James Clerk Maxwell Telescope, though other trace molecules can be used. Bipolar outflows are often found in dense, dark clouds. They tend to be associated with the very youngest stars (ages less than 10,000 years) and are closely related to the molecular bow shocks. Indeed, the bow shocks are thought to sweep up or "entrain" dense gas from the surrounding cloud to form the bipolar outflow.

Jets from more evolved young stars - T Tauri stars - produce similar bow shocks, though these are visible at optical wavelengths and are called Herbig–Haro objects (HH objects). T Tauri stars are usually found in less dense environments. The absence of surrounding gas and dust means that HH objects are less effective at entraining molecular gas. Consequently, they are less likely to be associated with visible bipolar outflows.

The presence of a bipolar outflow shows that the central star is still accumulating material from the surrounding cloud via an accretion disk. The outflow relieves the build-up of angular momentum as material spirals down onto the central star through the accretion disk. The magnetised material in these protoplanetary jets is rotating and comes from a wide area in the protostellar disk.

Bipolar outflows are also ejected from evolved stars, such as proto-planetary nebulae, planetary nebulae, and post-AGB stars. Direct imaging of proto-planetary nebulae and planetary nebulae has shown the presence of outflows ejected by these systems. Large spectroscopic radial velocity monitoring campaigns have revealed the presence of high-velocity outflows or jets from post-AGB stars. The origin of these jets is the presence of a binary companion, where mass-transfer and accretion onto one of the stars lead to the creation of an accretion disk, from which matter is ejected. The presence of a magnetic field causes the eventual ejection and collimation of the matter, forming a bipolar outflow or jet.

In both cases, bipolar outflows consist largely of molecular gas. They can travel at tens or possibly even hundreds of kilometers per second, and in the case of young stars extend over a parsec in length.

== Galactic outflow ==
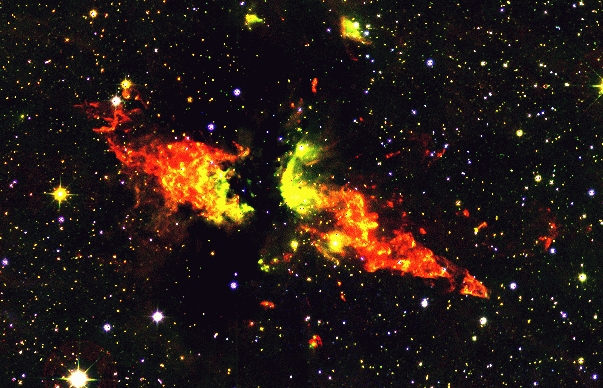
Infrared image of a bipolar outflow. The outflow is driven by a massive young star that was first identified as a radio source and catalogued "DR 21". The outflow itself is known as the DR21 outflow, or MHO 898/899.

Massive galactic molecular outflows may have the physical conditions such as high gas densities to form stars. This star-formation mode could contribute to the morphological evolution of galaxies.

== See also ==
- Accretion disc
- Astrophysical jet
- Bipolar nebula
- Herbig–Haro object
- Planetary nebula
