= List of protoplanetary nebulae =

This is a list of protoplanetary nebulae. These objects represent the final stage before a planetary nebula. During this stage, the red giant star begins to slowly expel its outermost layers of material. A protoplanetary nebula usually glows by reflecting the light from its parent star. This stage is usually brief, typically lasting no more than a few thousand years.

== List ==
Image	Name	Other designation	Date discovered	Distance (ly)
	Boomerang Nebula	Centaurus Bipolar Nebula	1980	5,000
	Calabash Nebula	OH231.8+4.2	1786	4,200
	Egg Nebula	CRL 2688	1996	3,000
	Frosty Leo Nebula	IRAS 09371+1212	1976	3,000
	Red Rectangle Nebula	HD 44179	1973	2,300 ± 300
	Cotton Candy Nebula	IRAS 17150-3224		8,000
	Water Lily Nebula	IRAS 16594-4656	1977	
		IRAS 22036+5306		6,500
	Westbrook Nebula	IRAS 04395+3601	1975	3,600 ± 700
		IRAS 13208-6020		
		IRAS 20068+4051		
	LL Pegasi	IRAS 23166+1655	1975	4,000
	M1-92	IRAS 19343+2926	1946	8,000
		IRAS 19024+0044		11,000
		IRAS 19475+3119		15,000
		IRAS 23304+6147	1988	15,000
	Roberts 22 (MR 22)	AFGL 4104	1962	6,500
		AS 314	1996	

== See also ==
- Lists of astronomical objects
