= Roberts 22 =

Protoplanetary nebula

Reflection nebula
- Protoplanetary nebula
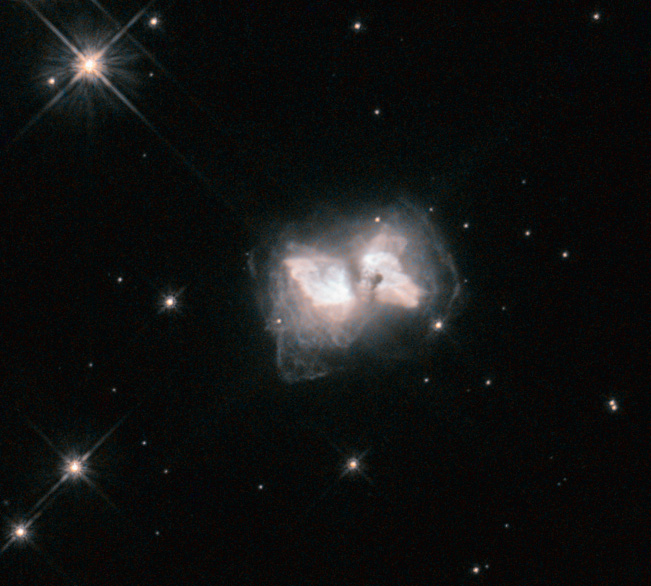

Observation data: J2000 epoch
- Right ascension: 10^{h} 21^{m} 33.8592^{s}
- Declination: −58° 05′ 47.663″
- Distance: 6,500 ly (2,000 pc)
- Apparent magnitude (V): 12.5
- Apparent dimensions (V): 10 × 4 arcsec
- Constellation: Carina
- Designations: MR 22, RAFGL 4104, Hen 3-404, OH 284.2-00.8, ASAS J102135-5805.9, IRAS 10197-5750

Roberts 22 is a protoplanetary nebula in the southern constellation Carina, located about 2,000 parsecs (6,500 lightyears) from Earth. A 12th magnitude object, it is far too faint to be seen with the naked eye.

In 1962, Morton S. Roberts of the Harvard College Observatory included this star in his catalogue of all known Wolf-Rayet Stars as entry number 22, giving the object its commonly used name, which is often shortened to MR 22. Later studies cast doubt on its classification as a Wolf-Rayet star. The star itself is completely hidden by dust (it is fainter than 16th magnitude), but its spectral type, A2 Ie, has been determined from the starlight reflected to us by the surrounding nebula.

OH maser emission at 1665 MHz was detected from Roberts 22 in 1969, but at that time its association with the star was unknown. By 1975, the maser emission had been associated with the nebula surrounding Roberts 22, but no connection with any star was noted. The association of the maser source with the Roberts 22 itself was made in 1980. Thermal (non-maser) CO emission was reported in 1991, the strength of which implied that the star is losing mass at a rate of about (1 to 1.5) × 10^{−4} solar masses per year, comparable to the mass loss rates of the Egg Nebula and Westbrook Nebula which are well-known protoplanetary nebulae.

High resolution optical imaging of Roberts 22 with the Hubble Space Telescope shows that the nebula has two bright lobes, reminiscent of a butterfly's wings, separated by a dark band of dust which obscures the central star. The lobes show a complex pattern of loops, filaments and point symmetries. The bright lobes are surrounded by a fainter halo which has several incomplete, thin shells. The timescale for the formation of these features is only a few hundred years.
