= IRAS 19024+0044 =

Large protoplanetary nebula in the constellation Aquila

Nebula
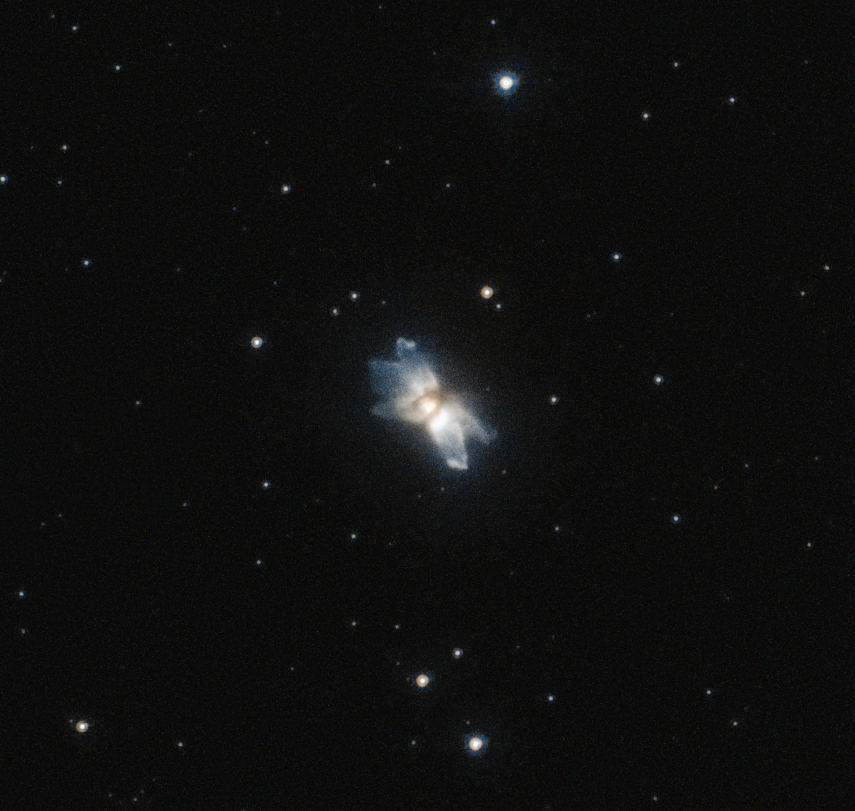
- The nebula, as imaged by the Hubble Space Telescope

Observation data: J2000 epoch
- Subtype: Protoplanetary nebula
- Right ascension: 19h 05m 02s
- Declination: +00° 48′ 50.9″
- Distance: ~11,000 ly ly
- Constellation: Aquila

IRAS 19024+0044, also known informally as the Starfish Nebula, is a large protoplanetary nebula that is located in the constellation Aquila at a distance of approximately 11,000 light-years from the Milky Way.

The central star of the nebula is approaching the final stage of its evolution. It is surrounded by a cloud of gas and dust resembling a starfish. The nebula is characterized by five blue bubbles that extend from the central star, giving the nebula an asymmetric shape. Its blue color comes from the blue component of the star's spectrum, which is more easily scattered by the nebula's gas and dust than the red and orange colors, which remain relatively intact.

The nebula was also directly imaged by the Hubble Space Telescope, and was selected as ESA/HUBBLE's Picture of the Week starting September 5, 2011.

== See also ==
- List of protoplanetary nebulae
