= William Westbrook =

American astronomer

- Born: William Elmer Westbrook; August 13, 1949; Denver, Colorado, U.S.
- Died: June 4, 1975 (aged 25); Beverly Hills, California, U.S.
- Education: South High School, Denver, Colorado School of Mines (BS); California Institute of Technology (MS)
- Known for: Westbrook Nebula
- Spouse: Joanne Klebba (m. 1971)
- Scientific career
- Fields: Astronomy
- Workplaces: California Institute of Technology

William Elmer Westbrook (August 13, 1949 – June 4, 1975) was an American astronomer who played a role in building equipment in the early years of the infrared laboratory at the California Institute of Technology (Caltech). He is best known for discovering and investigating the visual counterpart to the bright infrared source CRL 618. Now known to be a pre-planetary nebula, it was named for him after his death.

== Personal life ==
Westbrook graduated from Denver's South High School in 1967. The next year, he met Joanne Klebba at a school dance and they made plans to get married after he graduated from college. He graduated from the Colorado School of Mines in 1971 with a Bachelor of Science degree. He then moved to Pasadena, California and started to work and study at Caltech. Westbrook married Klebba on September 6, 1971 in Ranchester, Wyoming. He graduated from Caltech in 1973 with a Master of Science in physics and then began work on his doctor's degree at Mount Palomar Observatory.

== Career ==
In 1972, while working at Caltech’s Department of Physics, Westbrook began investigating previously unidentified infrared sources discovered in the Air Force Cambridge Research Laboratory’s rocket-borne infrared survey. He carried out infrared observations of these objects on several nights in 1973 and 1974 at Mount Wilson using the 60-inch (1.5m), Mount Palomar using the 200-inch (5m), and the Mauna Kea 88-inch (2.2m) telescopes. The most intriguing object he investigated was CRL 618 in Auriga along its border with Perseus. In visual light images taken with the 200-inch at Mount Palomar, he found the infrared source was associated with a very close pair of undiscovered nebulosity. The eastern member was three or four times brighter in visual light than the western member. In Gottlieb & Liller (1976), they found that the entire nebula had been B magnitude +18.8 in 1940 and brightened by about 0.06 magnitude per year to be B magnitude +16.5 in December, 1973. Westbrook's paper, "Observations of an Isolated Compact Infrared Source in Perseus", was submitted on March 27, 1975, revised on May 27, and published on December 1.

== Battle with cancer ==
A few years before 1968, Westbrook developed a recurring cough and sore throat that was treated for over a year as the flu. In his junior year of high school, a large tumor was discovered accidentally in his left lung. Diagnosed as rhabdomyosarcoma, it’s a rare type of cancer that usually forms in the soft tissue of children and adolescents. After the grapefruit-sized mass was removed along with much of his left lung, he underwent radiation treatments and chemotherapy. He continued to take chemotherapy for the remainder of his life and had x-rays of his lungs taken periodically. The tumor in his lung was detected again in late 1974 and continued to grow, invading most of his organs. A few months after submitting his first research paper, Westbrook died in Century City Hospital of Beverley Hills on June 4, 1975.

== Honors, awards, and commemorations ==
He graduated with honors from Denver's South High School in 1967.

He graduated from the Colorado School of Mines in 1971 and received the Max I. Silber Award for Highest Scholastic Achievement while there.

Westbrook’s doctoral adviser, Dr. Gerhart "Gerry" Neugebauer, and his colleagues in the Caltech Infrared Laboratory placed a commemorative bench and plaque on the grounds of Caltech near Throop Hall.
