= Cotton candy (disambiguation) =

Cotton candy is a form of spun sugar.

Cotton candy or Candy floss may also refer to:

- Cotton Candy (1978 film), a television movie directed by Ron Howard
- Cotton Candy (1997 film), a Canadian short film
- Cotton Candy (single-board computer) by FXI Technologies
- Cotton Candy grapes, a sweet hybrid variety of table grape
- Cotton Candy Nebula, a protoplanetary nebula'
- Candyfloss (novel), a novel by Jacqueline Wilson
- Candy Floss (wrestler), Croatian-English professional wrestler

== Music ==
- "Cotton Candy", song by horrorcore group Insane Clown Posse
- Cotton Candy (album), an album by Al Hirt
- Cotton Candy (band), resident band at the Cinnamon Club in the 1960s
- Cotton Candy (instrumental), a 1964 instrumental by Al Hirt
- Cotton Candy (Yungblud song), 2020
