= Calabash Nebula =

Protoplanetary nebula in the constellation of Puppis

Reflection nebula
- Protoplanetary nebula
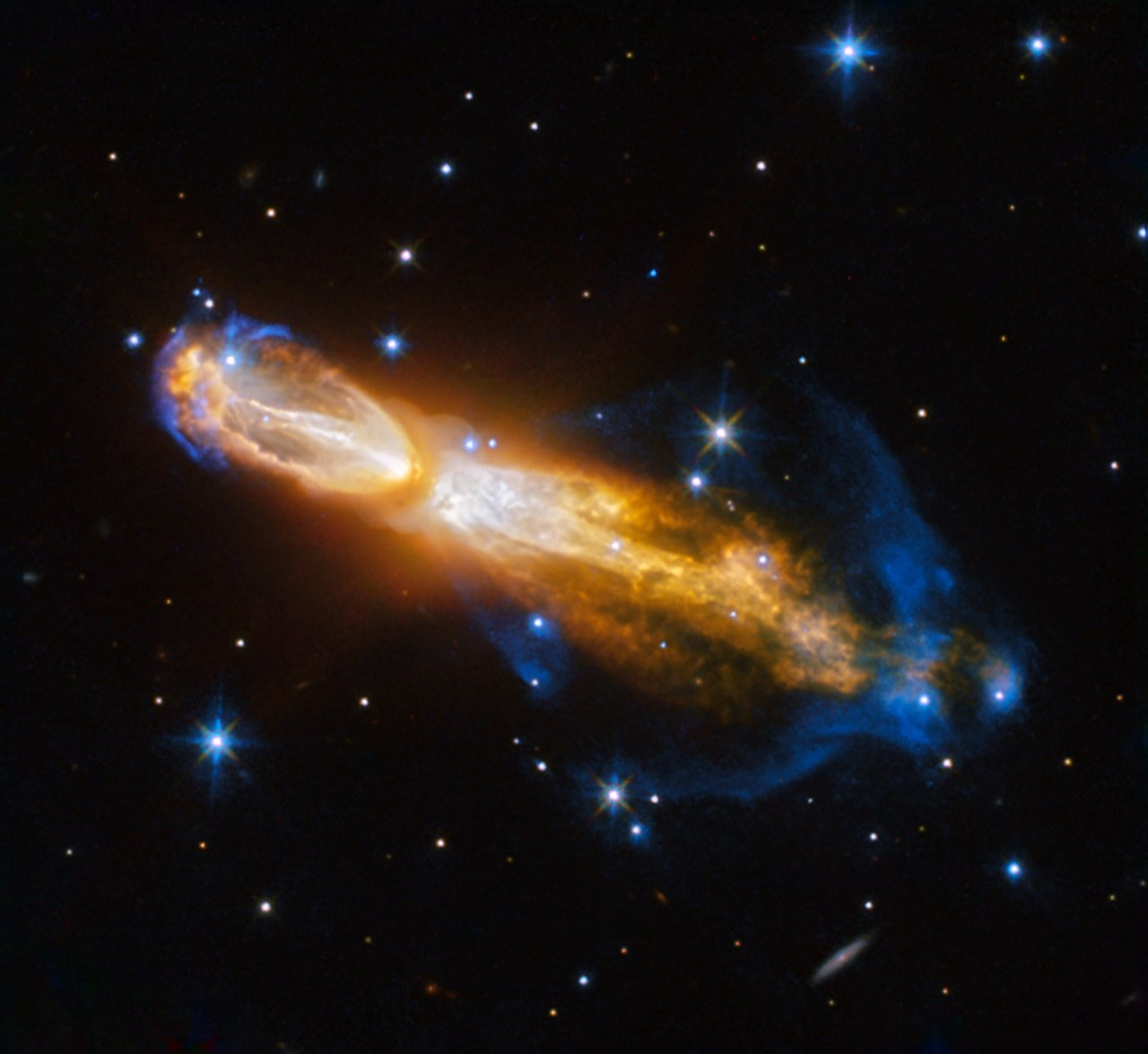
- The Calabash Nebula, as taken by Hubble Space Telescope

Observation data: J2000 epoch
- Right ascension: 07^{h} 42^{m} 16.83^{s}
- Declination: −14° 42′ 52.1″
- Distance: 4,200 ly (1,300 pc)
- Apparent magnitude (V): 9.47
- Apparent dimensions (V): 10 × 60 arcsec
- Constellation: Puppis

Physical characteristics
- Radius: 0.7^{[a]} ly
- Absolute magnitude (V): -1.4^{[b]}
- Designations: OH 231.84 +4.22, Rotten Egg Nebula

QX Puppis
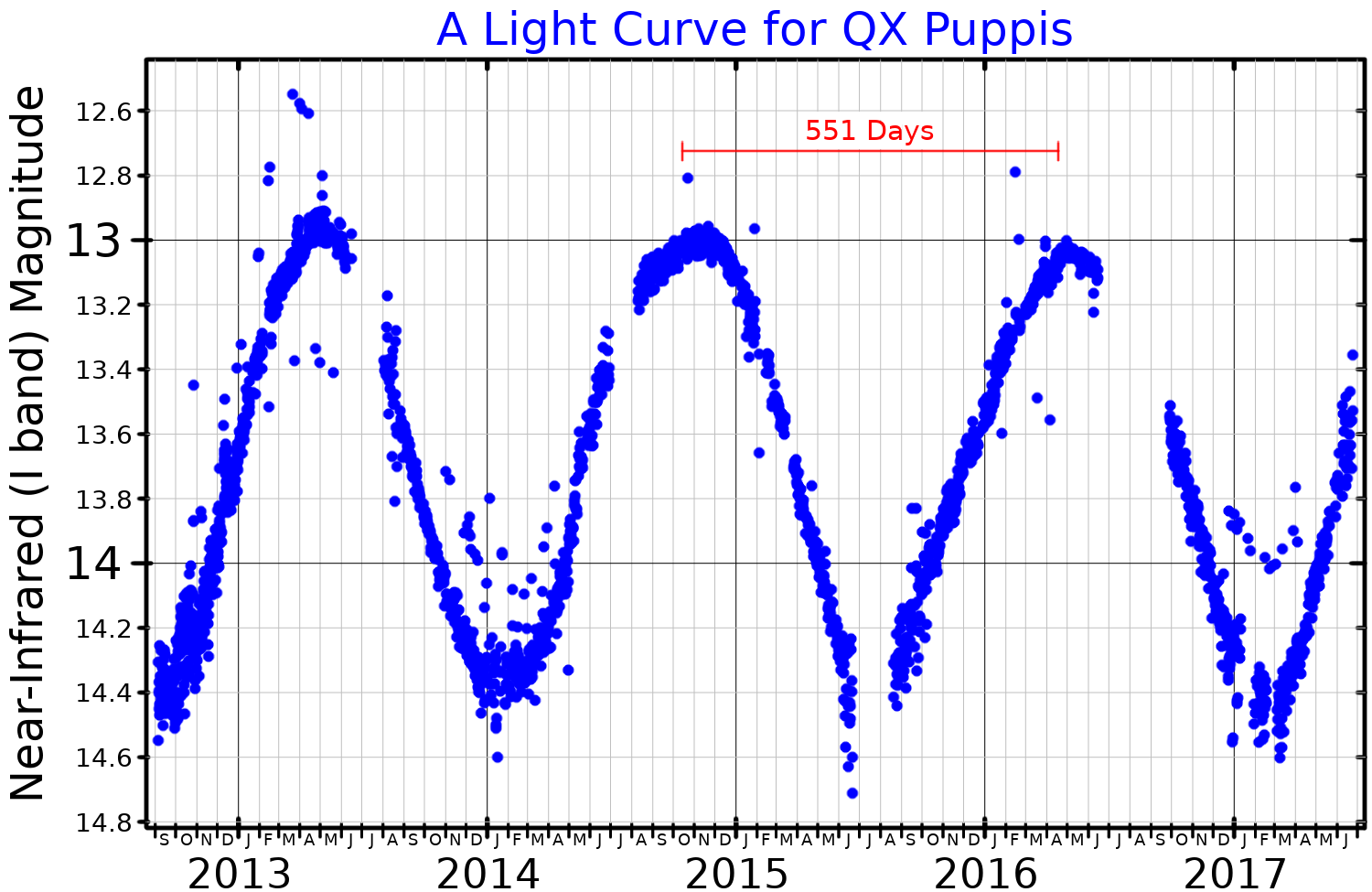
- A near-infrared (I band) light curve for QX Puppis, plotted from AAVSO data

Characteristics
- Evolutionary stage: OH/IR star
- Spectral type: M10III + A
- Variable type: Mira

Database references
SIMBAD	data

The Calabash Nebula, also known as the Rotten Egg Nebula or by its technical name OH 231.84 +4.22, is a protoplanetary nebula (PPN) 1.4 light-years (0.43 pc) long and located some 4,200 light-years (1,300 pc) from Earth in the constellation Puppis. The name "Calabash Nebula" was first proposed in 1989 in an early paper on its expected nebular dynamics, based on the nebula's appearance. The Calabash is almost certainly a member of the open cluster Messier 46, as it has the same distance, radial velocity, and proper motion. The central star is QX Puppis, a binary composed of a very cool Mira variable and an A-type main-sequence star.

== Ground-based imagery ==
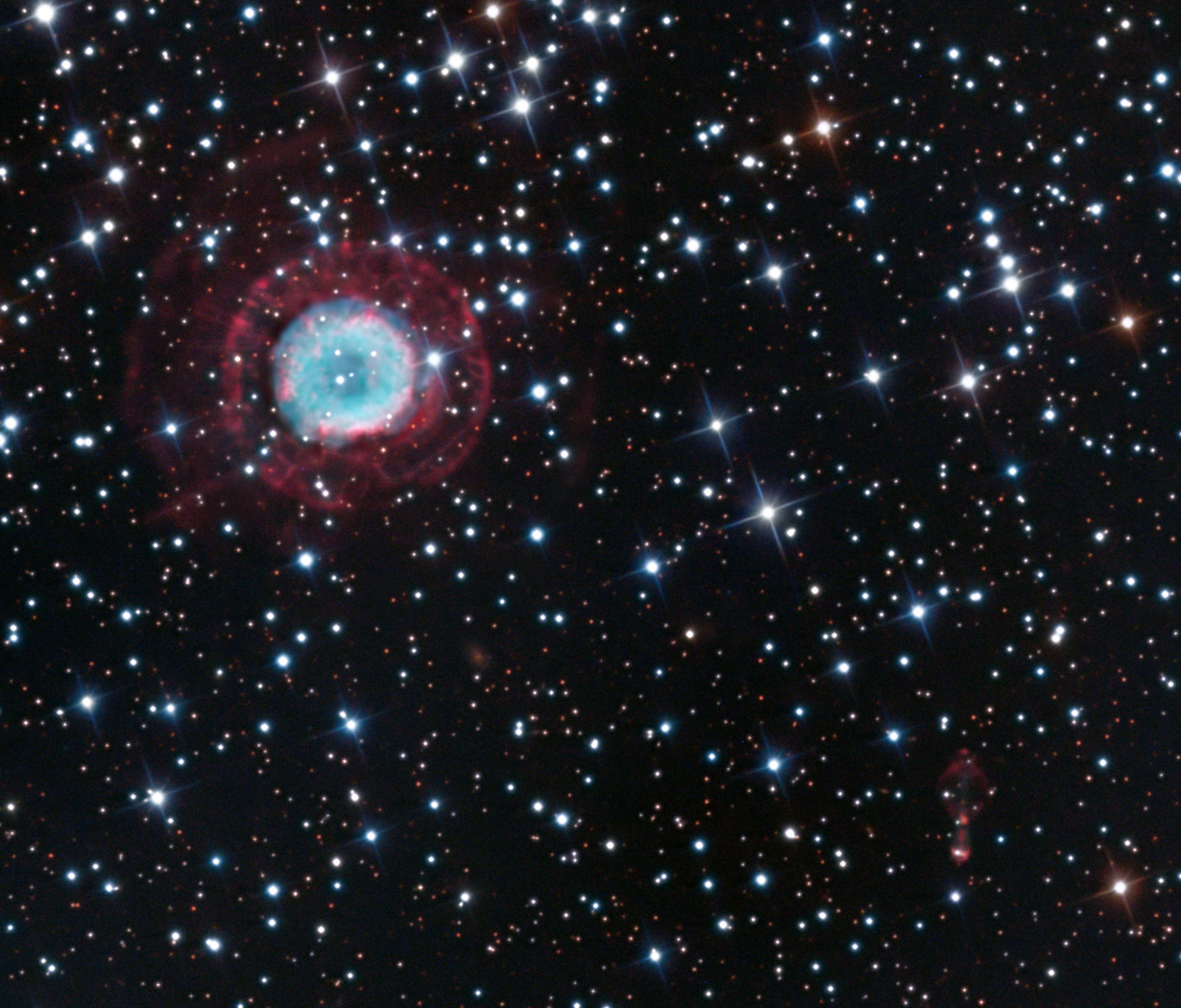
NGC 2438 (upper left) and the Calabash Nebula (lower right) taken from the Mount Lemmon SkyCenter using the 0.8 m Schulman Telescope.

In wide field images, the Calabash nebula is visible near the bright planetary nebula NGC 2438 in deep photographs. Although the Calabash Nebula is at the same distance as M46, NGC 2438 is a larger object in the foreground.

== Notes ==
1. Radius = distance × sin(angular size / 2) = 5 kly * sin(1′ / 2) = 0.7 ly
2. 9.47 apparent magnitude - 5 * (log_{10}(1,500 pc distance) - 1) = -1.4 absolute magnitude

== Sources ==
- Icke, Vincent [in Dutch]; Preston, Heather L. (1989), "The Dynamics of the Calabash Nebula", Astronomy and Astrophysics, 211 (2), NASA Astrophysics Data System (ADS): 409–412, Bibcode:1989A&A...211..409I
- Kastner, Joel H.; Weintraub, David A.; Merrill, K. M.; Gatley, Ian (1998), "Direct Detection of the Mira at the Heart of OH 231.8+4.2", The Astronomical Journal, 116 (3), SIMBAD, Centre de Données Astronomiques de Strasbourg: 1412–1418, Bibcode:1998AJ....116.1412K, doi:10.1086/300520, S2CID 119845097
- "Results for Red Rectangle", SIMBAD Astronomical Database, January 4, 2007
