= M1-92 =

Protoplanetary Nebula in the constellation of Cygnus

M 1-92
Emission nebula
- Planetary nebula
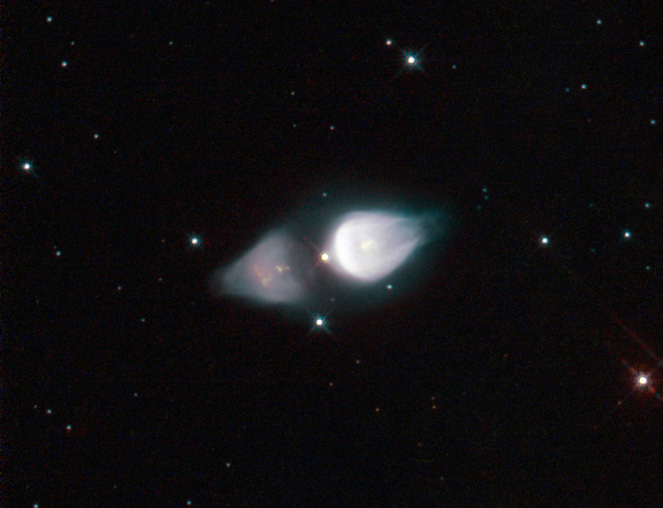
- Minkowski 92 as seen by the Hubble Space Telescope

Observation data: J2000.0 epoch
- Right ascension: 19^{h} 36^{m} 18.0^{s}
- Declination: +29° 33′ 00″
- Distance: 8000 ly
- Apparent magnitude (V): 11.7
- Apparent dimensions (V): 8 × 16 arcsec
- Constellation: Cygnus

Physical characteristics
- Radius: 0.31 ly
- Absolute magnitude (V): -
- Notable features: -
- Designations: Footprint Nebula, IRAS 19343+2926

M1-92 (Minkowski 92), also known as Minkowski’s Footprint or the Footprint Nebula, is a bipolar protoplanetary nebula in the constellation of Cygnus. It is a type of reflection nebula, visible only by light reflected from the central star. The central star is not yet a white dwarf but is quickly becoming one. In a few thousand years the star will be hot enough to emit vast quantities of ultraviolet radiation that will ionize the nebula surrounding it, making it a fully fledged planetary nebula.

M1-92 was discovered by Rudolph Minkowski in 1946. It was imaged by the Very Large Array (VLA) in 1983 and by Hubble Space Telescope in 1996. The object is 8,000 light-years away from Earth, and has a radial velocity of -7.086 kilometers (-4.4 miles) a second. Its axis is tilted 35 degrees from our line of sight. It is 11 by 6 arcseconds in angular size. It is 0.42 light-years in diameter and shines at 10,000 solar luminosities.

The most obvious feature of M1-92 is the two onion-shaped lobes on either side of the central star. Stellar winds sculpt the lobes into their shape. Dust partially obscures the southeastern lobe, making it appear much dimmer than the other. Material is bursting through the ends of the lobes, creating two polar tips. The temperature of these tips is roughly 450 K, while the lobes themselves are at 17 K. Inside the lobes are bright knots, ionized from shock, which dash through the nebula at 55 km/s (34 mi/s). Also present is a narrow jet. The jet’s axis slightly differs from that of the lobes, indicating that the central star is precessing. The central star is surrounded by an expanding circumstellar dust disk. The temperature of the progenitor star is estimated to be around 27,000 K, much cooler than the temperatures of white dwarfs which run from 50,000 to 250,000 K. The hypothesis that the central star is actually a binary system is promising for this object.

M1-92’s spectrum is rather complex. It is composed of the highly polarized spectrum of the central star, and various emission lines from ionized gas. Some lines are intermediately polarized, and others are not polarized at all. The intermediately polarized emission lines are also reflected, but the unpolarized lines are shock emission generated from inside the bipolar lobes. Shock emission is a major part of the spectrum of the M1-92 nebula.

The dust grains in the bipolar lobes are submicron-sized; on the other hand, dust grains in the circumstellar disk could be up to 1 mm. If the disk grains were micron-sized or smaller, it would be difficult to explain the amount of carbon monoxide (CO) in the disk. The largest dust grains in the disk must be at least 0.1 mm. Grain growth is likely to occur in the M1-92 disk. Hydroxide (OH) was discovered in the object in 1974, and is located in the dust disk but not in the lobes.

It has been proposed that M1-92 is similar to MWC 560, a symbiotic star. Their spectra have striking similarities, and they both have a thick equatorial dust disk and a collimated jet. It is thought that MWC 560 is in an earlier evolutionary stage by 900-1,200 years, not having ejected a nebula yet.

== See also ==
- List of protoplanetary nebulae
