= Water Lily Nebula =

Protoplanetary Nebula in the constellation Ara

Reflection nebula
- Protoplanetary nebula
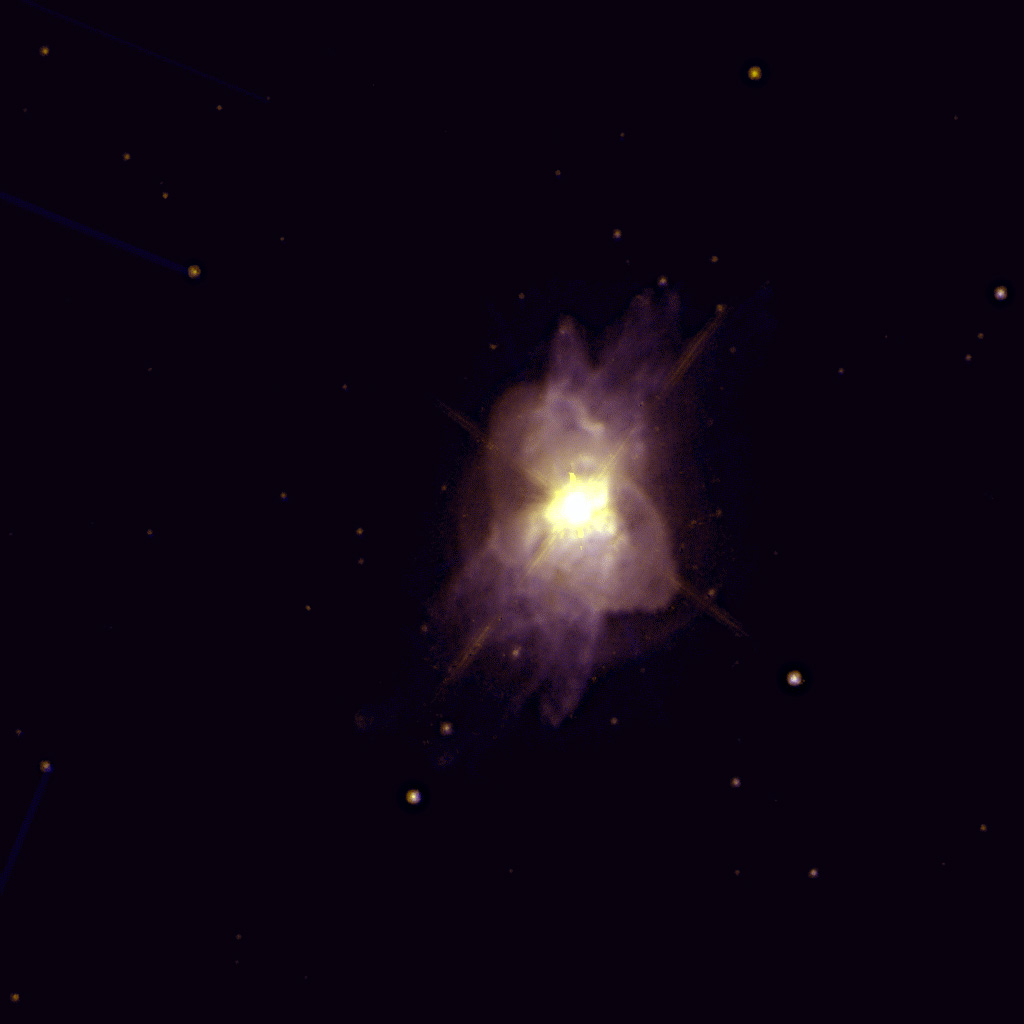
- HST image of the Watery Lily Nebula by Sun Kwok, Bruce Hrivnak, and Kate Su

Observation data: J2000 epoch
- Right ascension: 17^{h} 03^{m} 10.08^{s}
- Declination: −47° 00′ 27.7″
- Constellation: Ara
- Designations: IRAS 16594-4656, 2MASS J17031007-4700277, PN G340.3-03.2

The Water Lily Nebula, in the southern constellation of Ara, is a pre-planetary nebula in the process of developing to a planetary nebula. The central star is known as IRAS 16594-4656. It was discovered by Bruce Hrivnak and Sun Kwok in 1999. The Water Lily is one of the pre-planetary nebulae containing polycyclic aromatic hydrocarbons, organic hydrocarbons otherwise constituting the basis for life.
