= IRAS 12063−6259 =

Compact H II region in the constellation of Crux

Emission nebula
- H II region
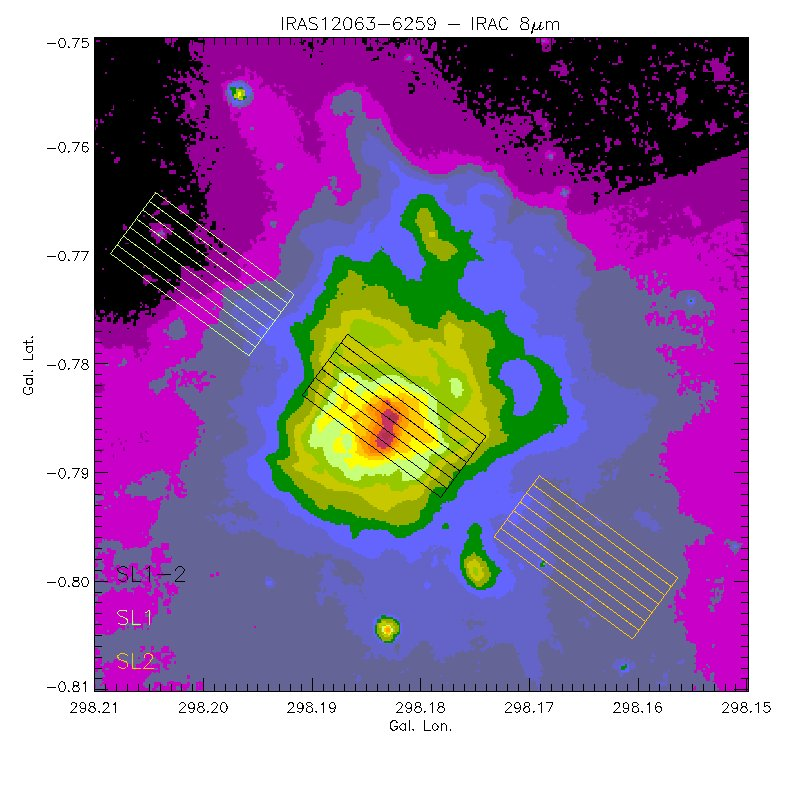

Observation data: J2000 epoch
- Right ascension: 12^{h} 09^{m} 01.1^{s}
- Declination: −63° 15′ 54.7″
- Distance: 30,985 ly (9,500 pc)
- Apparent dimensions (V): 16"x7"
- Constellation: Crux

Physical characteristics
- Radius: 1.20 ly
- Notable features: star forming region
- Designations: G298.19-0.78, RAFGL 4144, He 2-77, PK 298-00.1

IRAS 12063−6259 is a compact H II region in the constellation of Crux. It lies at a heliocentric distance of roughly 9.5 kpc and a galactocentric distance of 9.3 kpc. Although previously classified as a planetary nebula as well as an H II region, this source is now solely classified as a normal compact H II region, due to its colour criteria, its infrared luminosity, and its spectral content.

Radio observations from the Australia Telescope Compact Array (ATCA) reveal IRAS 12063−6259 to consist of a compact object roughly 16"x7" which is embedded in a low brightness region 28"x25". The compact region contains two compact objects at 4.8 GHz, labelled Radio A and Radio B, while at higher frequencies (8.6 GHz) Radio B is further resolved into subcomponents B1 and B2. This complex substructure points towards the presence of multiple ionising stars rather than a single star.
