= IRAS 22036+5306 =

Protoplanetary nebula

Nebula
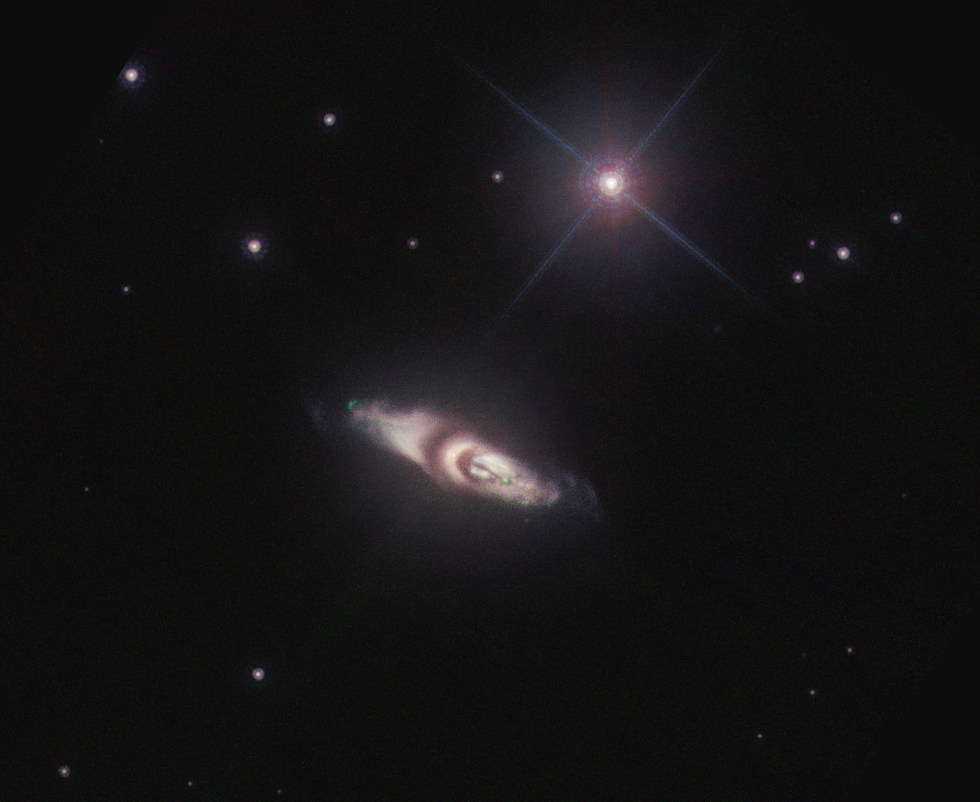
- IRAS 22036+5306, as photographed by the Hubble Space Telescope

Observation data: J2000 epoch
- Right ascension: 22h 05m 30,29s
- Declination: +53° 21′ 32,8″
- Distance: 6,500 ly

IRAS 22036+5306, also known as 2MASS J22053028+5321327, is a protoplanetary nebula located in the constellation Cepheus at approximately ~6,500 light-years from Earth.

The nebula was created by the shedding of most of the material in the outer shell of an aging star. The gas cloud formed is heated by the still burning hot core of the star. A torus formed mainly of ejected material was formed around the star. Two jets of material are ejected from the poles of the dying star, piercing the dusty curtain. These jets eject large amounts of material weighing tens of thousands of times the mass of Earth at speeds reaching 800,000 kilometres per hour (500,000 mph).

The ejected dust now scatters the light from the central star and reflects it, among other things, towards the Earth. However, soon the central star will reach the stage of a very hot white dwarf, whose intense ultraviolet radiation will ionize the gas, causing it to glow with multi-colored light. Then, IRAS 22036+5306 will transform into a formal planetary nebula, and the cooling star will begin the last stage of its life.

== See also ==
- List of protoplanetary nebulae
