= AS 314 =

Protoplanetary nebula in the constellation Scutum

V452 Scuti
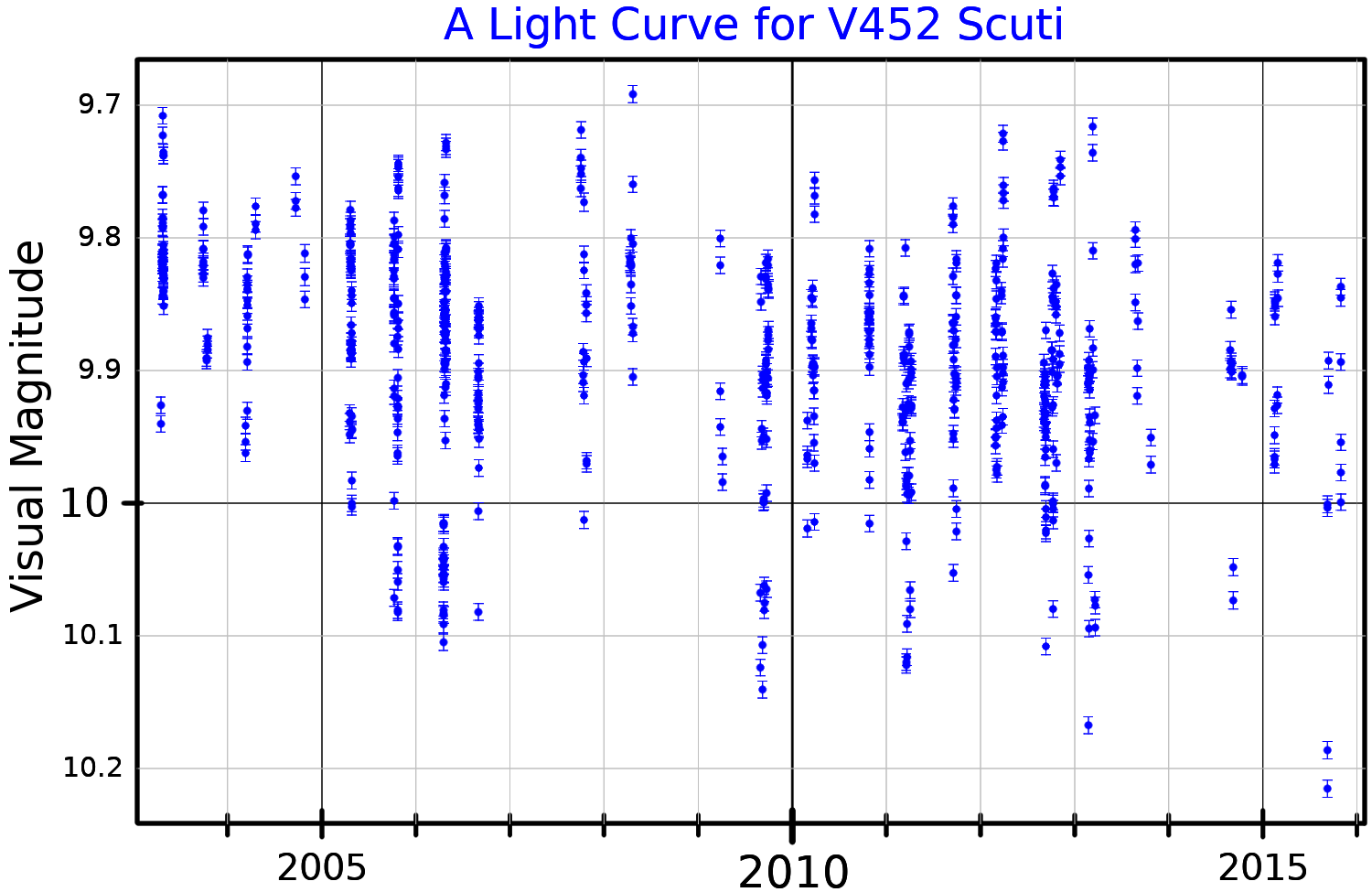
- A visual band light curve for V452 Scuti, plotted from OMC data

Observation data Epoch J2000 Equinox ICRS
- Constellation: Scutum
- Right ascension: 18^{h} 39^{m} 26.10226^{s}
- Declination: −13° 50′ 47.1597″
- Apparent magnitude (V): 9.85

Characteristics
- Spectral type: Protoplanetary nebula
- U−B color index: +0.12
- B−V color index: +0.89
- Variable type: α Cyg?

Astrometry
Radial velocity (R_{v})	−77±8 km/s
Proper motion (μ)	RA: −4.416 mas/yr Dec.: −6.241 mas/yr
Parallax (π)	0.5853±0.0141 mas
Distance	5,600 ± 100 ly (1,710 ± 40 pc)

Details
Luminosity	3,200 L_{☉}
Temperature	10,200 K

Other designations
- V452 Sct, BD−13°5061, HIP 91477, 2MASS J18392610-1350470

Database references
SIMBAD	data

AS 314, also known as V452 Scuti, is a protoplanetary nebula once believed to be a white hypergiant star or luminous blue variable located in the constellation of Scutum. It has an apparent magnitude of 9.85 and can be seen with small telescopes.

== Characteristics ==
AS 314 was found to be a variable star in 1996, when the Hipparcos data was analyzed. For that reason it was given the variable star designation V452 Scuti, in 1999.

AS 314 was poorly studied until the year 2000, when Miroshnichenko et al. incorrectly estimated a distance for this star of around 10 kiloparsecs (32,600 light years), a luminosity 160,000 times that of Sun (L_{☉}), a radius 200 times the solar radius (R_{☉}), and an initial mass of 20 solar masses (M_{☉}). It was also estimated to be losing 2 × 10^{−5} M_{☉} each year (in other words, 1 M_{☉} every 50,000 years) through a very strong stellar wind.

AS 314 has an infrared excess, suggesting that it is shrouded in a circumstellar envelope of dust. However, it has not been classified as a bona fide luminous blue variable, but as a candidate.

The Hipparcos parallax and proper motions are large and imply a much closer, and hence less luminous, star. The Hipparcos measurement was later confirmed by the Gaia mission, reclassifying AS 314 as post-AGB star.
