= IRAS 20068+4051 =

Protoplanetary nebula in constellation Cygnus

Nebula
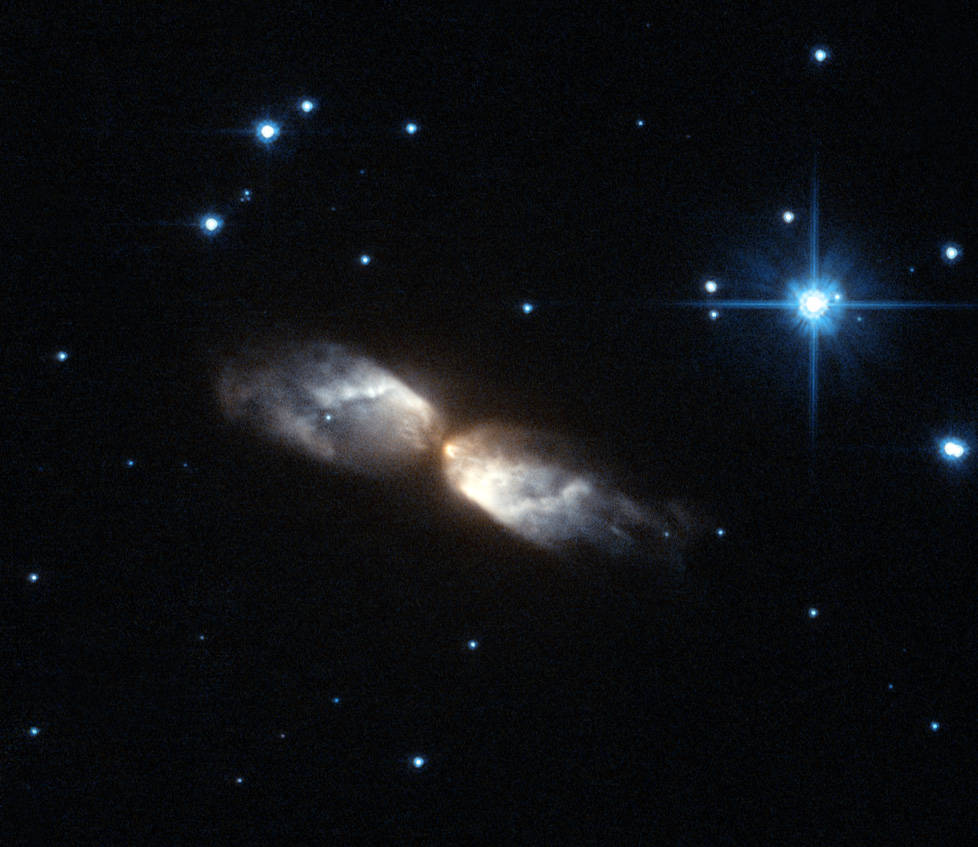

Observation data: J2000 epoch
- Right ascension: 20^{h} 08^{m} 38.455^{s}
- Declination: +41° 00′ 40.69″
- Constellation: Cygnus

IRAS 20068+4051 is a protoplanetary nebula in the constellation Cygnus. It has not yet become a complete planetary nebula, and it is still in the short-lived protoplanetary nebula phase. IRAS 20068+4051 has given astronomers insight into how planetary nebulae form and evolve over time.

== Discovery ==
IRAS 20068+4051 was first discovered and observed during a sky survey with the Infrared Astronomical Satellite and later was later observed further with the Hubble Space Telescope.

== See also ==
- List of protoplanetary nebulae
