= Cotton Candy Nebula =

Nebula in the constellation of Scorpius

Reflection nebula
- Protoplanetary nebula
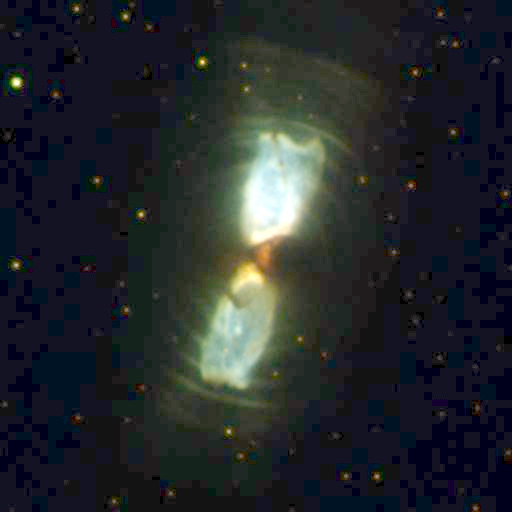
- The Cotton Candy Nebula as seen by the Hubble Space Telescope

Observation data: epoch
- Right ascension: 17^{h} 18^{m} 20^{s}
- Declination: −32° 27′ 22″
- Constellation: Scorpius

The Cotton Candy Nebula, also known as IRAS 17150-3224, is a bipolar nebula in the constellation of Scorpius. It is considered to fall into an unusual category of nebulae known as protoplanetary nebulae or post-AGB stars. Protoplanetary nebulae are created by stars transitioning from the asymptotic giant branch to the planetary nebula phase. It discards its outer atmosphere, and its core collapses into a white dwarf. This object is a good example of a DUPLEX-type (DUst-Prominent Longitudinally-EXtended) protoplanetary nebula. The spherical ring structures around the nebula were created throughout the asymptotic giant branch stage, which is the penultimate stage in stellar evolution. It, like many other protoplanetary nebulae, were originally discovered by the IRAS satellite. IRAS was launched in January 1983 and surveyed about 96 percent of the sky.

The Cotton Candy Nebula is difficult to spot considering it is only 16 arcseconds long and hardly shines. Michael E. Bakich is an Astronomy senior editor and has studied the Cotton Candy Nebula. He has confirmed that the nebula can be seen through a telescope with an aperture of 16 inches. With the help of the IRAS 17150-3224 and the nebulae being in the perfect position where the starlight is blocked, we were able to examine the ring-like structures that "cocoon" the nebula as astronomer Sun Kwok put it.
