= IRAS 19475+3119 =

Nebula in the constellation Cygnus

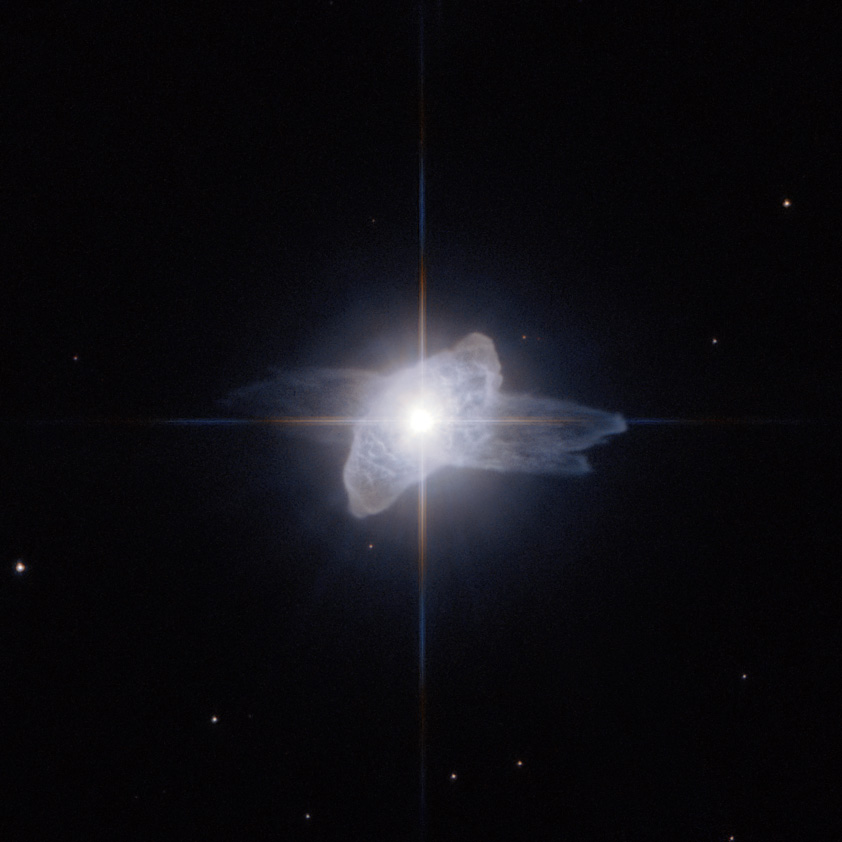
- IRAS 19474+3119

Observation data Epoch J2000 Equinox J2000
- Constellation: Cygnus
- Right ascension: 19^{h} 49^{m} 29.5618^{s}
- Declination: +31° 27′ 16.249″
- Apparent magnitude (V): 9.33 - 9.50

Characteristics
- Evolutionary stage: Protoplanetary nebula
- Spectral type: F3 Ibe
- Variable type: SRd

Astrometry
Proper motion (μ)	RA: −0.156 mas/yr Dec.: −1.684 mas/yr
Parallax (π)	0.3159±0.0209 mas
Distance	4,900 pc

Details
Mass	0.63 M_{☉}
Radius	58 R_{☉}
Luminosity	8,300 L_{☉}
Surface gravity (log g)	0.5 cgs
Temperature	7,200 K
Metallicity [Fe/H]	−0.25 dex

Other designations
- V2513 Cyg, BD+31°3797, HD 331319

Database references
SIMBAD	data

IRAS 19475+3119 is a protoplanetary nebula in the constellation of Cygnus, 15,000 light-years away. The central star, V2513 Cygni, is an F-type post-AGB star.

The brightest portion of the nebula shows a quadrupolar structure, with elongated bipolar lobes, all surrounded by a faint halo.

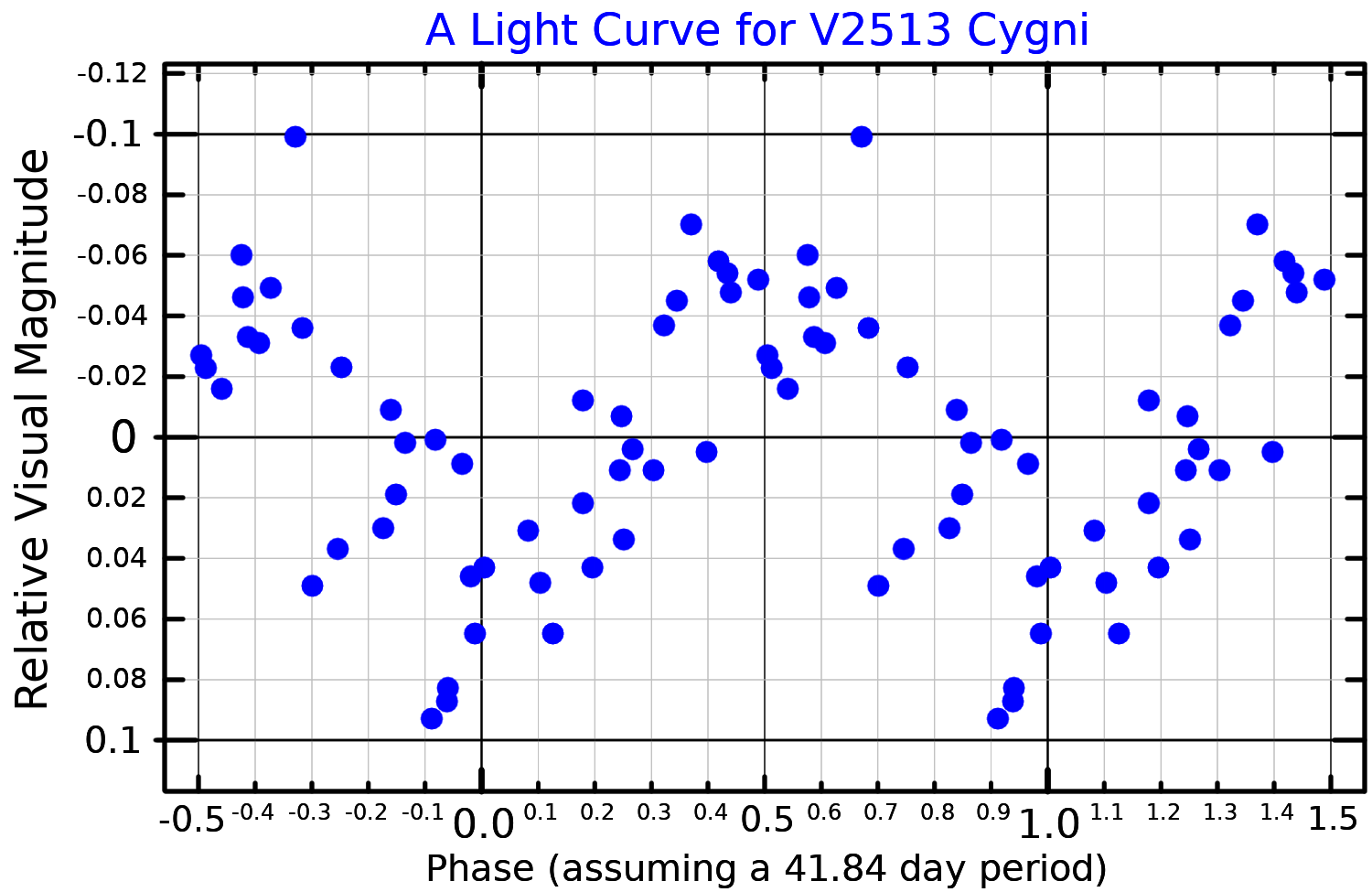
A visual band light curve for V2513 Cygni, adapted from Hrivnak et al. (2018)

The distance is essentially unknown. Assumptions about the luminosity have been used to estimate the distance and other stellar parameters. At an assumed kinematical distance of 4.9 kpc, the luminosity is 8,300 L_{☉} and the radius 58 R_{☉}. The star was originally at least 2.5 M_{☉} and is now 0.63 M_{☉}. Assuming a luminosity of 3,500 L_{☉}, the distance becomes 1.5 kpc. Estimates based on the oxygen spectral line strengths give much higher values luminosities with an absolute magnitude of at least −8.

In 2006, Vera P. Arkhipova et al. announced that IRAS 19475+3119 is a variable star. It was given its variable star designation, V2513 Cygni, in 2013. The star varies from about magnitude 9.33 to 9.50. A primary period of 41 days has been determined, but a slightly shorter secondary period leads to long beats causing variations in the amplitude and apparent period from year to year. The variations are caused by stellar pulsations, with the star being brightest when it is hottest. The temperature varies by up to 400 K.
