= Messier 46 =

Open cluster in the constellation Puppis

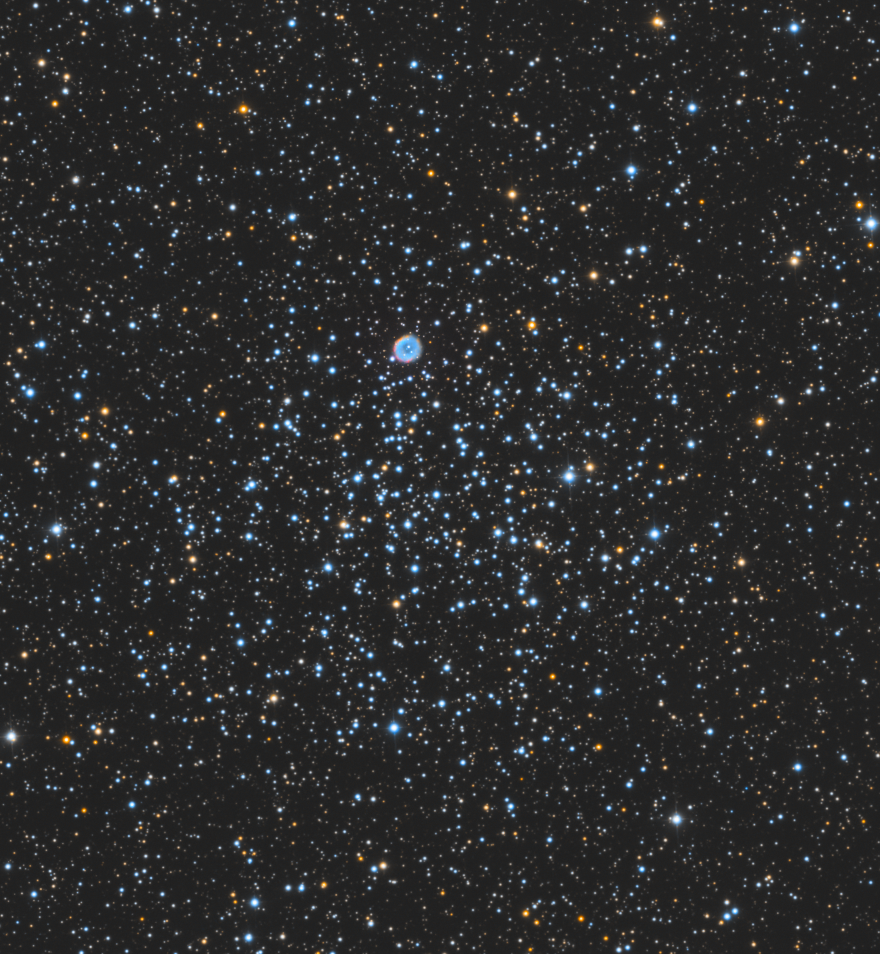
- Open cluster Messier 46 and the planetary nebula NGC 2438

Observation data (J2000.0 epoch)
- Right ascension: 07^{h} 41^{m} 46.0^{s}
- Declination: −14° 48′ 36″
- Distance: 4,920 ± 980 ly (1,510 ± 302 pc)
- Apparent magnitude (V): 6.0
- Apparent dimensions (V): 22.8′

Physical characteristics
- Mass: 453+214 −145 M_{☉}
- Radius: 37.8 ly
- Estimated age: 251.2 Myr
- contains superimposed planetary nebula NGC 2438
- Other designations: M46, NGC 2437, Cr 159, C 0739-147, OCl 601.0

Associations
- Constellation: Puppis

Messier 46 or M46, also known as NGC 2437, is an open cluster of stars in the slightly southern constellation of Puppis. It was discovered by Charles Messier in 1771. Dreyer described it as "very bright, very rich, very large." It is about 5,000 light-years away. There are an estimated 500 stars in the cluster with a combined mass of 453 M_{☉}, and it is thought to be a mid-range estimate of 251.2 million years old.

The cluster has a very broadest (tidal) radius of 37.8 ± 4.6 ly (11.6 ± 1.4 pc) and core radius of 8.5 ± 1.3 ly (2.6 ± 0.4 pc). It has a greater spatial extent in infrared than in visible light, suggesting it is undergoing some mass segregation with the fainter (redder) stars migrating to a coma (tail) region. The fainter stars that extend out to the south and west may form a tidal tail due to a past interaction.

The planetary nebula NGC 2438 appears to lie within the cluster near its northern edge (the faint almost rainbow array of colored smudge at the top-center of the image), but it is most likely unrelated since it does not share the cluster's radial velocity. This makes for superimposed objects of interest, another instance perhaps being NGC 2818. On the other hand, the illuminating star of the bipolar Calabash Nebula shares the radial velocity and proper motion of Messier 46, and is at the same distance, so is a bona fide member of the open cluster.

M46 is located close by to another open cluster, Messier 47. M46 is about a degree east of M47 in the sky, so the two fit well in a binocular or wide-angle telescope field.

== See also ==
- List of Messier objects
- Messier object
