= Candyfloss (novel) =

2006 novel by Jacqueline Wilson

- First edition (publ. Doubleday)
- Author: Jacqueline Wilson
- Illustrator: Nick Sharratt
- Publisher: Doubleday UK
- Publication date: April 4, 2006
- ISBN: 9780385608374

Candyfloss is a novel written by Jacqueline Wilson and illustrated by Nick Sharratt. It was first published in 2006 by Doubleday.

== Plot summary ==
11 year-old Flora "Floss" Barnes' mother Sally and father Charlie split up when she was little and she wishes they'd get back together because she doesn't like her stepfather, Steve, and her little half-brother Tiger. The book opens on Floss's birthday where Sally and Steve tell her that they are going to Australia for six months because of Steve's job. Floss wants to go with them, but she doesn't want to leave Charlie who's a cheerful and fun dad, who runs his own café which is quickly going out of business. Later that day, Floss goes with Sally, Steve and Tiger to TGI Friday's.

Floss convinces Sally that she can live with Charlie, while they are in Australia. Floss has a tough time getting used to life without her mother since her father is not used to taking care of Floss seven days a week and she is not used to his home seven days a week, either. Floss's school uniforms get dirtier and disarrayed as Charlie is not used to washing and ironing them, but her teacher, Mrs. Horsefield, helps her out, as Floss is one of her personal favorite students. The father and daughter learn to cope and meet Rose, a very caring woman who works at a fair. After Rose leaves (traveling with the fair), they keep an eye out for her at the fair. Meanwhile, a regular customer at the café Billy the Chip puts money on a horse that Floss selects, and he wins money on the horse.

Floss also has her best friend, Rhiannon, who isn't much of a friend – making fun of her and her father and starting cruel rumours about Floss's mother walking out on Floss. Rhiannon's posh and snobby mother assumes that Charlie is an unfit father and repeatedly tries to lecture him and pamper Floss believing she is living in an unclean dump. Floss ends her friendship with Rhiannon and finds a new friend, Susan, who is interested in all her favorite things. This causes Rhiannon to turn on her and befriends the class's other bullies Margot and Judy. She continually torments Floss by calling her and Susan, respectively, "Smelly Chip" and "Swotty Potty", later "Pongy Twit" and "Spotty Botty".

After Charlie loses the café and the flat, Billy the Chip mentions he is going to Australia to visit his son for one month and needs Floss and Charlie to live in his house while Charlie works in Billy's chip van. However, one day, a group of "yobbos" (as Charlie calls them) fight Rose's son Saul and when he attempts to stop the fistfight, the van catches on fire with Floss trapped inside. Charlie fights his way through the fire and rescues her, while in the process burning his hands. When the fair comes back in town, Rose and Charlie consider dating, and Floss finds out both are interested in each other and get along well, while Rose lets Floss help her in the candyfloss stall. Later, Susan, along with her parents, goes to stay in her holiday home in France and says farewell to Floss at the beginning of summer. The book closes with Floss thinking about dying her hair pink (like candy floss).

== Characters ==
- Flora "Floss" Barnes – A generally happy and bubbly girl who sometimes struggles to stand up for herself. She makes the life changing choice to remain with her father Charlie when her mother Sally, stepfather Steve, and half-brother Tiger (Tim) go to Australia. She falls out with her best friend Rhiannon but later becomes friends with Susan. She is small with masses of blonde curly hair which she dyes purple. She has a strong love for cats, and keeps a cat which she finds in her dad's back garden and calls it Lucky.
- Charlie Barnes – Floss's father, Sally's ex-husband. He runs a little local café but is massively in debt and loses it midway through the book. He ends up running a chip van until it gets burnt down. He is plump with dark hair. Despite being a little absent minded sometimes, he cares deeply for Floss and only wants what's best for her. He saves her life when the chip van gets burnt down. He ends up starting a romantic relationship with Rose from the funfair.
- Sally (Sal) Westwood – Floss and Tiger's mother, Charlie's ex-wife. She is a pretty woman who after divorcing Charlie, got remarried to Steve and had a son with him named Tim (who is known as Tiger). She tries to act posh. She still gets on with Charlie though she is always mocking his way of being. She announces to Floss on her birthday that the whole family is moving to Australia for Steve's new job and is heartbroken when Floss remains with Charlie. Floss gets defensive when anyone says Sally walked out on her. Although Floss stays with her father, she misses her mother terribly.
- Steve Westwood – Sally's husband, Tiger's father and Floss's stepfather. He gets a job offer in Australia in the beginning of the book, where he and the family get to stay there for 6 months while he works. Floss decides to stay with her father. It is implied that Charlie is jealous of Steve.
- Tim (Tiger) Westwood – Floss's half-brother, the son of Steve and Sally. His real name is Tim, but Floss calls him Tiger because of his tiger-like personality.
- Susan Potts – The new girl in Floss's class who is extremely clever. She was nicknamed 'Swotty Potty' by Judy and Margot. She wants to be Floss's friend but is scared of Rhiannon. Once Floss breaks friends with Rhiannon though, Susan and Floss become best friends. They both enjoy art, books and being creative. Susan has short brown hair, glasses and a massive obsession with numbers.
- Rhiannon – Floss's former best friend. She is very pretty with straight black hair and a slim figure. She is also rich and enjoys flaunting her wealth. She can be very rude along with Margot and Judy who bully Susan and Floss after the two fall out. She lies to people that Floss's mother has walked out on her when she hasn't.
- Margot – Rhiannon's best friend. Along with Judy and Rhiannon she bullies Floss and calls her smelly chip. Margot is described by having "such a flat tummy" according to Rhiannon and she likes to speak in a fake American accent.
- Judy – Margot's best friend at the start of the book before she becomes best friends with Rhiannon. Not much is said about Judy. She has black hair in pigtails. Judy also bullies Floss with Margot and Rhiannon. They eventually leave Judy out and Judy just trails along
- Mrs Horsefield – Floss and Susan's kindly teacher, who does her best to support Floss and her father throughout the book. She eventually admits that Floss and Susan are her favourite pupils.
- Rose – The woman who runs the candyfloss stall at the funfair that Floss and Charlie go to at the start. She is very compassionate and helps Floss and Charlie when they get in a fight. At the end of the book she returns to thank Charlie for saving her son Saul during the fight and fire at the chip van. She develops romantic feelings for Charlie as well at the end and is in favour of Charlie and Floss joining up with the fair in the summer. She is pretty with blonde hair and wears much red and pink clothing. She says she is much older than Charlie.
- Saul – Rose's son. He also has a girlfriend called Jenny. Charlie saved him from a fight outside of the chip van.
- Mrs Van Dyke – Deputy Head of Floss's school, the scariest strictest teacher in the whole school.
- Billy the Chip – A regular at Charlie's cafe. He has his own chip van, but says no one can beat Charlie's chip butties. He often bets on horses. Towards the end of the book, Charlie loses the cafe, and Billy lets Charlie and Floss move into his house and look after his cats while he is away visiting his son in Australia and also asks if Charlie could help at his chip van, which Charlie agrees to do. Billy's house is ancient, and contains very old items.
- Mr Potts – Susan's father. He is only mentioned once in the book, when he drops Susan round at Charlie's house for a playdate with Floss. Not much is said about him, but Floss remarks that he looks much older than her father.
- Rhiannon's mother – Rhiannon's mother. She raises concern about Floss and Charlie's living situation, and thinks Charlie is not looking after Floss properly. She often gives Charlie advice, and once made Rhiannon have a day out with Floss, meaning that Floss had to cancel her playdate with Susan. She and Rhiannon are very rich.

== Reception ==
Candyfloss received starred reviews from Booklist and Publishers Weekly. Sundae Girl reached fifth place in the Children's books Bestsellers section compiled by the Sunday Independent in April 2007.

In a starred review, Booklist's Kathleen Isaacs highlighted how "Wilson produces a poignant, gently humorous, and totally satisfying tale".

Kirkus Reviews highlighted the novel's heavy issues, including "poverty, bankruptcy, drunken/bawdy adult behavior, bullying and unconditional parental/child love". To that list, Publishers Weekly added the "compelling sometimes gritty elements" of "shopping, gambling, fair-going, romance, a knife-fight and even a scary fire". Kirkus concluded that the "open-ended conclusion" will "provoke readers’ questions and speculation" and the novel provides possibilities for "mother/daughter discussion".

Multiple reviewers commented on Candyfloss's characters. Isaacs called the novel's protagonist, Floss, "charmingly believable" and "idiosyncratic", while Kirkus Reviews referred to her as "determined". School Library Journal's Catherine Ensley found her to be a "likable character". Kirkus also noted that the novel includes "a group of believable secondary characters—though they’re somewhat melodramatic in their thoughts and actions". Publishers Weekly also highlighted Floss's relationship with her father, who is " fully dimensional in all his flaws" and ,"whose love for his daughter often clouds his judgment".

Reviewers also mentioned the "one-page black-and-white set of graphic novel–style scenes" that foreshadow each chapter.

== References to other Wilson novels ==
Charlie reads Floss a chapter of a story about a girl and a magic toad, which could be a reference to Wilson's 1987 novel Glubbslyme.
