= NGC 2438 =

Planetary nebula in the constellation Puppis

Emission nebula
- Planetary nebula
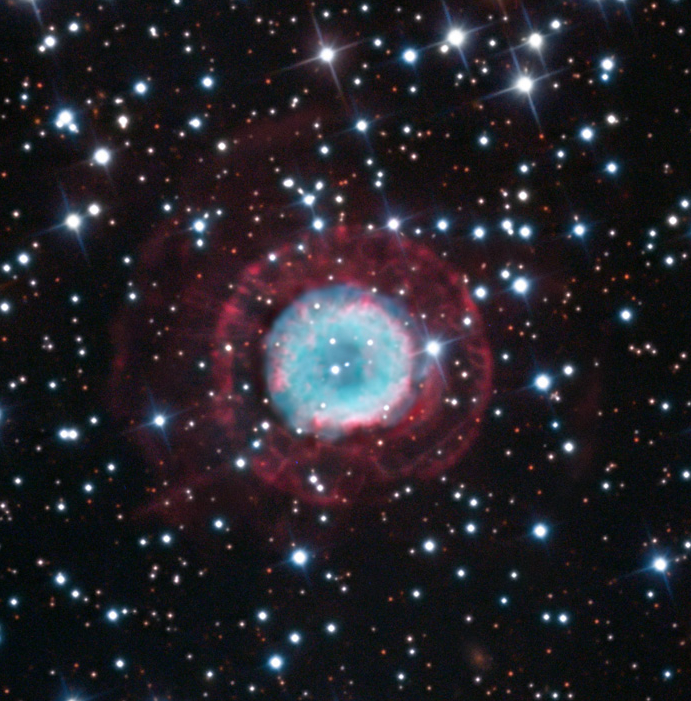

Observation data: J2000.0 epoch
- Right ascension: 07^{h} 41^{m} 50.51986^{s}
- Declination: −14° 44′ 07.4843″
- Distance: 1,370 ± 130 ly (420 ± 40 pc) ly
- Apparent magnitude (V): +10.8
- Apparent dimensions (V): 1.3′
- Constellation: Puppis
- Notable features: Superimposed on Messier 46
- Designations: H IV.39, FC 87, PK 231+4.2

NGC 2438 is a planetary nebula in the southern constellation of Puppis. Parallax measurements by Gaia put the central star at a distance of roughly 1,370 light years. It was discovered by William Herschel on March 19, 1786. NGC 2438 appears to lie within the cluster M46, but it is most likely unrelated since it does not share the cluster's radial velocity.

The object is a multi-shell planetary nebula with a bright inner nebula with a diameter of 60″, consisting of two somewhat detached shells. It is expanding with a velocity of 37 km/s. The structure is surrounded by a fainter, mostly circular halo that is more visible on the western half, and has a diameter of 130″. The mass of the main nebula is estimated at 0.45 M_{☉}, while the shell has 0.5–0.8 M_{☉}. The main nebula has a temperature of about 10–13,000 K, rising to 15–17,000 K at the inner edge.

The nebula consists of material ejected from the central star during the asymptotic giant branch stage, beginning about 8,500 years ago. The main nebula was formed at about half that age. The central star of this planetary nebula is a 17.7-magnitude white dwarf, with a surface temperature of about 75,000 K (74,700 °C).
