= IRAS 13208−6020 =

Preplanetary nebula in Constellation Centaurus

IRAS 13208−2060
Nebula
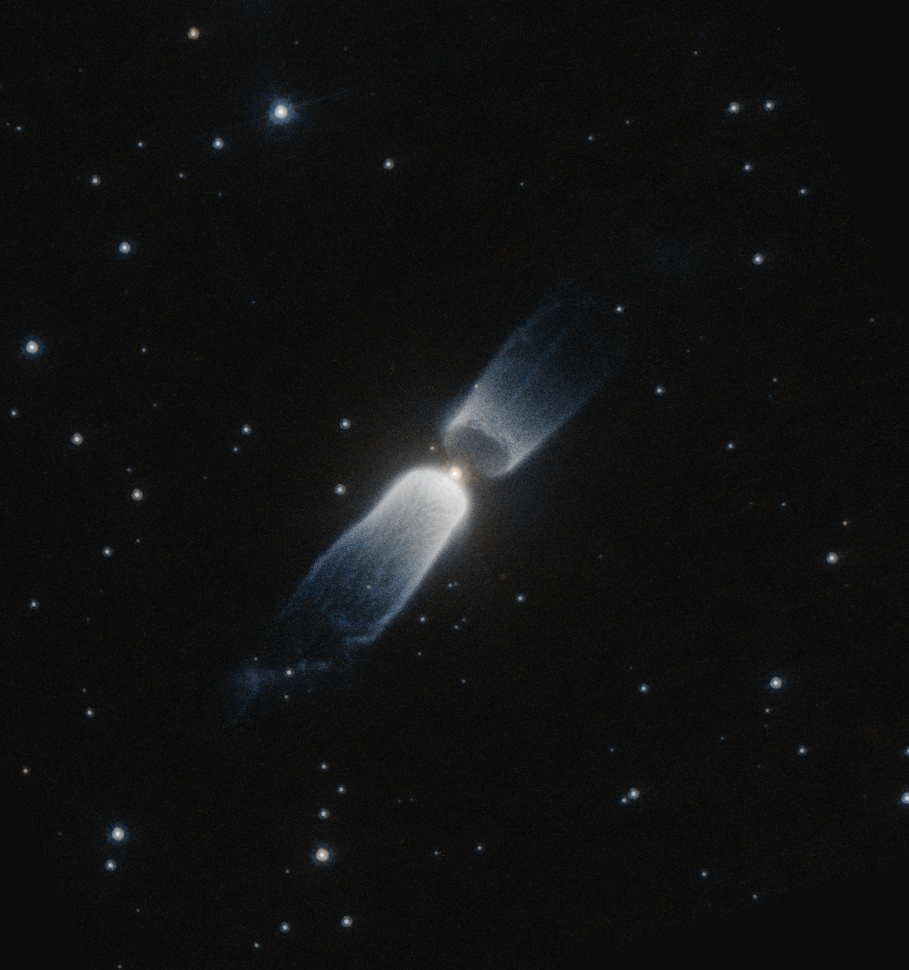
- IRAS 13208−2060, as photographed by the Hubble Space Telescope

Observation data: J2000 epoch
- Right ascension: 13h 24m 04,40s
- Declination: −60° 36′ 30,7″
- Constellation: Centaurus

IRAS 13208−6020 is a preplanetary nebula in the constellation Centaurus. These nebulae are formed from material that is shed by a central star. It was first discovered and observed during the IRAS Sky Survey. This is a relatively short-lived phenomenon that gives astronomers an opportunity to watch the early stages of planetary nebula formation, hence the name protoplanetary, or preplanetary nebula.

== Characteristics ==
IRAS 13208−6020 has a very clear bipolar form, with two very similar outflows of material in opposite directions and a dusty ring around the star. It does not shine, but is instead illuminated by light from the central star. IRAS 13208−6020 is not currently in the planetary nebula stage, and it is assumed to be very early in its lifespan.
