= Egg Nebula =

Protoplanetary nebula

Reflection nebula
- Protoplanetary nebula
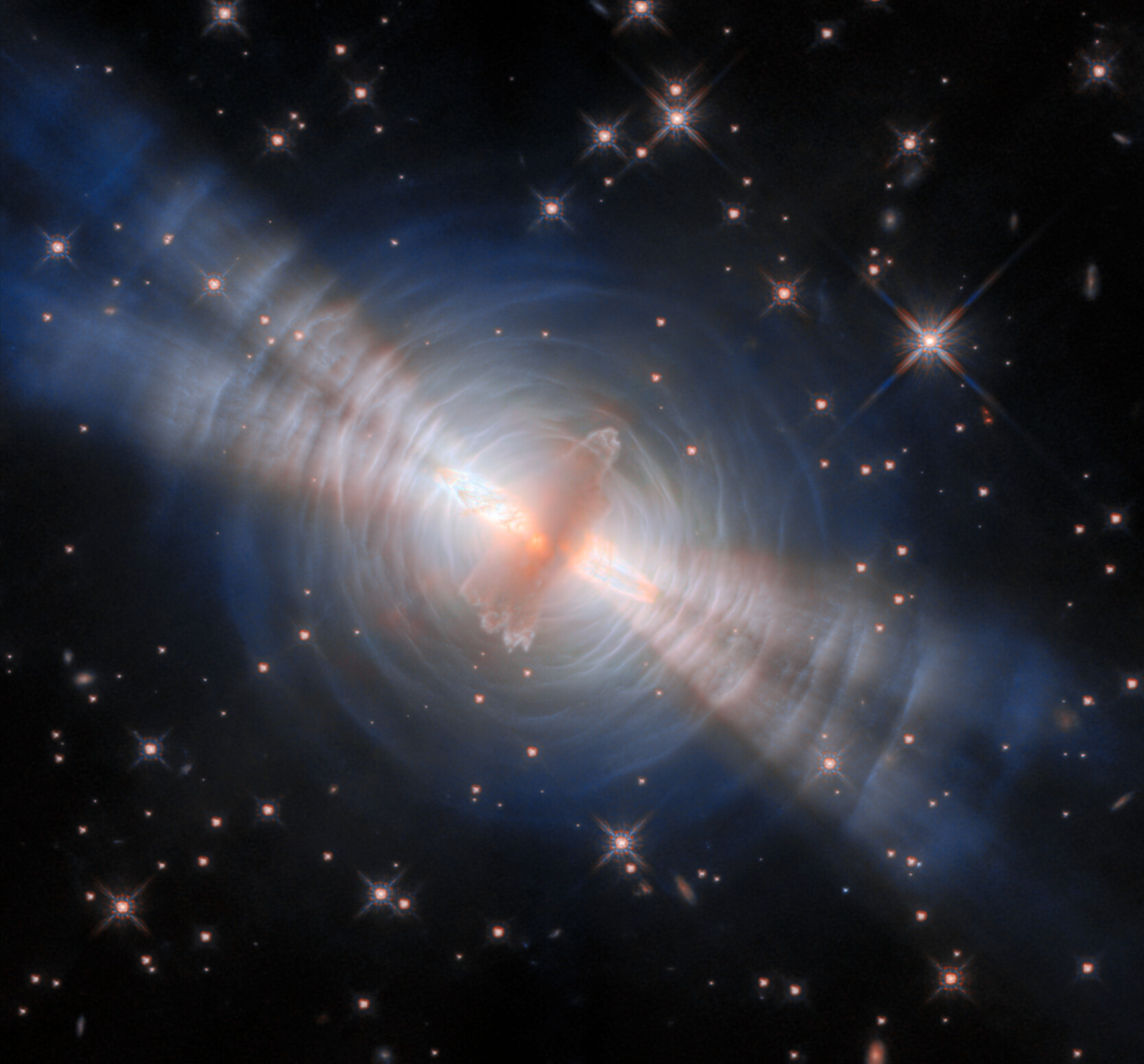
- The Egg Nebula imaged by the Hubble Space Telescope

Observation data: J2000 epoch
- Right ascension: 21^{h} 02^{m} 18.75^{s}
- Declination: +36° 41′ 37.8″
- Distance: approx 3000 ly (920 pc)
- Apparent magnitude (V): 14.0
- Apparent dimensions (V): 30″ × 15″
- Constellation: Cygnus

Physical characteristics
- Radius: 0.2^{[a]} ly
- Absolute magnitude (V): 4.2^{[b]}
- Designations: CRL 2688, The Egg, Cygnus Egg V1610 Cyg

The Egg Nebula (also known as RAFGL 2688 and CRL 2688) is a bipolar protoplanetary nebula approximately 3,000 light-years away from Earth. Its peculiar properties were first described in 1975 using data from the 11 μm survey obtained with sounding rocket by Air Force Geophysical Laboratory (AFGL) in 1971 to 1974. (Previously, the object was catalogued by Fritz Zwicky as a pair of galaxies.)

== Description ==
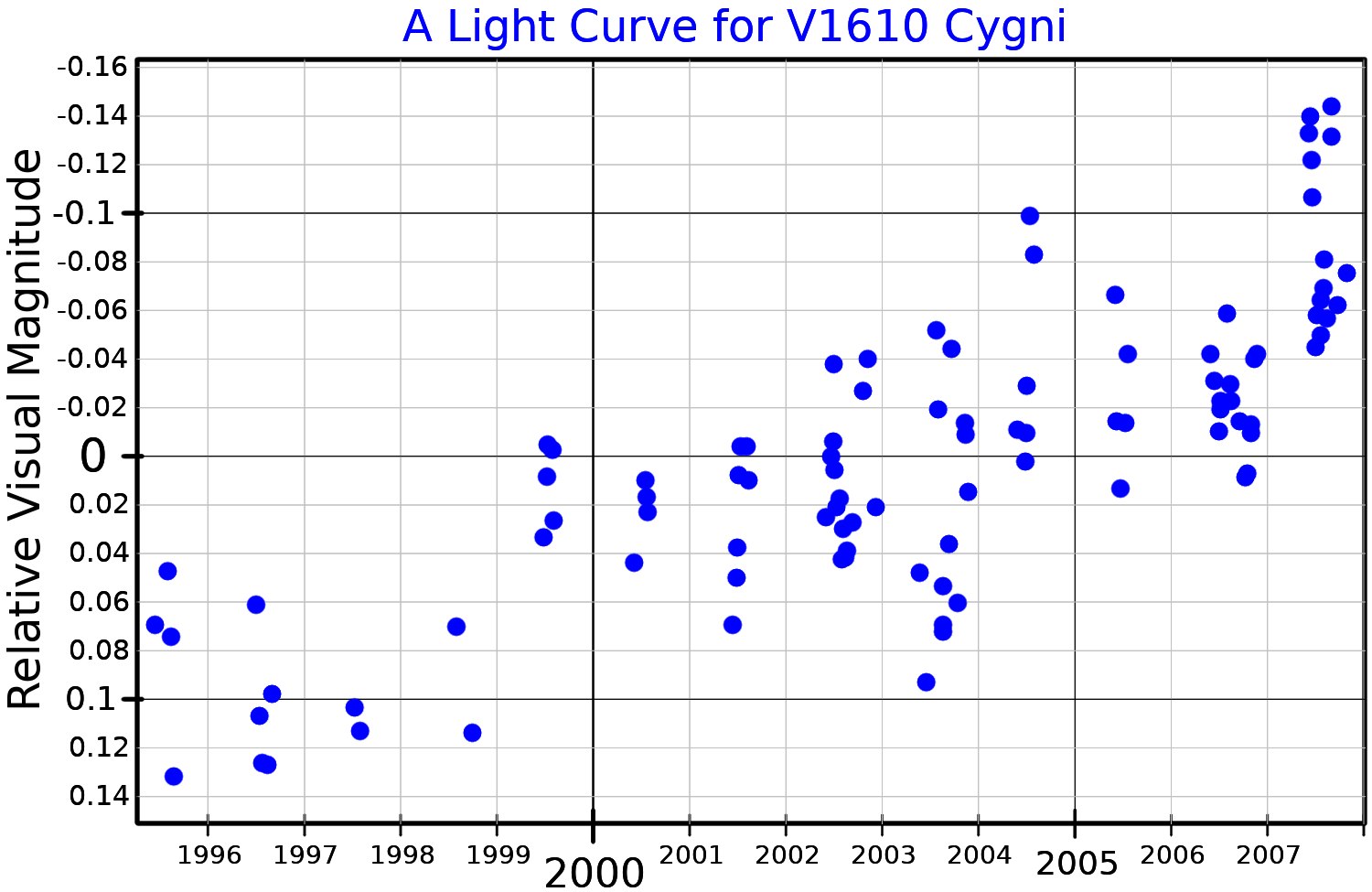
A visual band light curve for V1610 Cygni (the Egg Nebula), adapted from Hrivnak et al. (2010)

The Egg Nebula's defining feature is the series of bright arcs and circles surrounding the central star. A dense layer of gas and dusts enshrouds the central star, blocking its direct light from our view. However, the light from the central star penetrates the thinner regions of this dusty enclosure, illuminating the outer layers of gas to create the arcs seen in this resplendent image (Hubble Site). Spectra of the starlight scattered by the dust reveal that the central star V1610 Cygni has a spectral type of F5. The photosphere of an F5 star is about 900 K hotter than that of the Sun, but it is still not hot enough to have begun ionizing the nebula. Therefore the Egg Nebula is at a slightly earlier evolutionary stage than the Westbrook Nebula whose spectral type B0 central star has just recently begun to ionize the nebula.

The dusty enclosure around the central star is very likely a disc. The bipolar outflows in the image indicate that the system has angular momentum, which is very likely generated by an accretion disc. In addition, a disc geometry would account for the varying thickness of the enclosure that allows light to escape along the disc's axis and illuminate the outer layers of gas, but still blocks it from our direct view along the disc edge. Although dusty discs have been confirmed around several post-AGB objects (S. De Ruyter et al., 2006), a disc around the Egg Nebula is yet to be confirmed.

The Egg Nebula shows strong microwave emission from rotational transitions of carbon monoxide (CO) and hydrogen cyanide (HCN). The presence of strong HCN emission indicates that the progenitor AGB star was a carbon star. Millimeter wave spectral lines from 38 molecular species have been detected in the outflow. The CO and HCN spectra have a strong blue-shifted P Cygni absorption feature, and show the presence of a ~100 km/sec high velocity wind inside of the remnant AGB wind (which is expanding at 18 km/sec).

The Egg Nebula was photographed by the Wide Field and Planetary Camera 2 of the NASA/ESA Hubble Space Telescope. The Egg Nebula emits polarized light which can also be detected visually by a medium-sized telescope.

== Notes ==
1. distance × sin ( diameter_angle / 2 ) = 0.2 ly. radius
2. 14.0 apparent magnitude - 5 * (log_{10}(920 pc distance) - 1) = 4.2 absolute magnitude
