= Central Star =

Coordinates: 35°09′06.0″N 129°03′40″E

Central Star consists of four residential skyscrapers under construction in Busan, South Korea. The tallest landmark tower measures 207 m (679 ft) tall and has 58 floors. Ground was broken by POSCO E&C in 2007 and is completing in 2011.
