= Sun Kwok =

Hong Kong astronomer

Sun Kwok (Chinese: 郭新, born September 15, 1949) is a Hong Kong astronomer best known for his work on physics and chemistry of the late stages of stellar evolution. In 1978, he proposed a new theory on the origin of planetary nebulae. which has transformed our understanding of the death of Sun-like stars. He is a pioneer on the study of stellar synthesis of organic compounds, which may have implications on the origin of life on Earth.

== Background ==
Born in Hong Kong, Sun Kwok graduated from Pui Ching Middle School, the same school attended by Daniel Chee Tsui, Nobel Prize Winner in Physics and Shing-Tung Yau, Fields Medal Winner.

- Chair Professor of Space Science and Director of Laboratory for Space Research, University of Hong Kong (2016-2018)
- Chair Professor of Physics and Dean of Science, University of Hong Kong (2006-2016)
- President, International Astronomical Union (IAU) Commission F3: Astrobiology (2015-2018)
- Fellow of the American Association for the Advancement of Science (2012-)
- Distinguished Research Fellow and Director, Institute of Astronomy & Astrophysics, Academia Sinica, Taiwan (2003–2006)
- Professor, University of Calgary (1983–2005)
- President, IAI Commission 34: Interstellar Matter (2012-2015)
- Vice President, IAU Commission 51: Bioastronomy (2012-2015)
- Chairman, IAU Working Group on Planetary Nebulae (Division VI) (1994–2001)
- Principal Investigator (Astronomy), Canadian participation in the Odin mission

== Research ==
In addition to his work on planetary nebulae, Kwok was also recognized for his discovery of proto-planetary nebulae, the missing link in our understanding of the late stages of stellar evolution, and the discovery of the unidentified emission feature at 21 micrometres which is believed to be an unusual carbonaceous compound . Using space-based infrared telescopes, he has found that organic compounds with aromatic and aliphatic structures can be synthesized rapidly in the late stages of stellar evolution. These star-manufactured compounds are now known to have spread widely throughout the Galaxy, and are believed to have played a role in the chemical enrichment of the early solar system.

His book Stardust: Cosmic Seeds of Life (Springer 2013) was selected by Choice Magazine as an "Outstanding Academic Title" for 2014.

== Education reform ==
As Dean of Science at the University of Hong Kong, Kwok introduced a number of education reforms, including the major/minor system in 2006, Faculty-wide common admission in 2007, experiential learning in 2007, and science foundation courses in 2012. He developed and taught a common core course "Our Place in the Universe" which highlights the influence of astronomical development on philosophy, religion, and society.

== Selected publications ==
- Kwok, Sun (2000), The origin and evolution of planetary nebulae, Cambridge University Press, ISBN 0-521-62313-8
- Kwok, Sun (2001), Cosmic Butterflies, Cambridge University Press, ISBN 1-891389-46-7
- Kwok, Sun (2007). Physics and Chemistry of the Interstellar Medium, University Science Books, (ISBN 1-891389-46-7)
- Kwok, Sun (2011), Organic Matter in the Universe, Wiley, 2011 (ISBN 978-3-527-40986-0)
- Kwok, Sun (2013) Stardust: The Cosmic Seeds of Life, Springer, 2013 (ISBN 978-3-642-32801-5)
- Kwok, Sun (2017) Our Place in the Universe: understanding fundamental astronomy from ancient discoveries, Springer, (ISBN 978-3-319-54172-3)
- Kwok, Sun (2021) Our Place in the Universe II: the scientific approach to discovery, Springer, (ISBN 978-3-030-80260-8)
