= Westbrook Nebula =

Bipolar planetary nebula

Reflection nebula
- Protoplanetary nebula
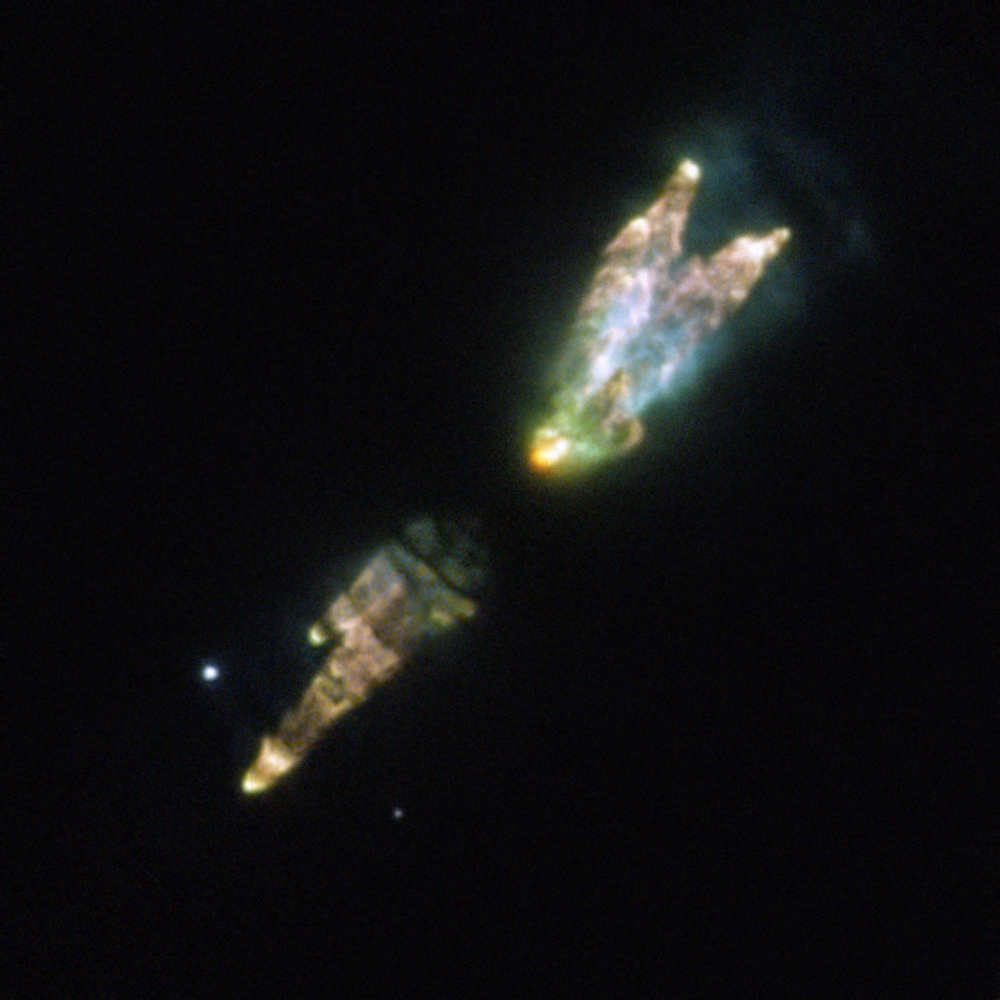
- Hubble image of the Westbrook Nebula

Observation data: J2000 epoch
- Right ascension: 04^{h} 42^{m} 53.64^{s}
- Declination: +36° 06′ 53.4″
- Distance: 3600 ± 700 ly (1100 ± 200 pc)
- Constellation: Auriga
- Designations: CRL 618, IRAS 04395+3601, 2MASS J04425364+3606534, RAFGL 618

Westbrook Nebula (CRL 618) is a bipolar protoplanetary nebula which is located around 3600 light years from Earth in the constellation of Auriga. It is being formed by a star that has passed through the red giant phase and has ceased nuclear fusion at its core. This star is concealed at the center of the nebula, and is ejecting gas and dust at velocities of up to 200 km/s. The nebula is named after William E. Westbrook, who died in 1975.

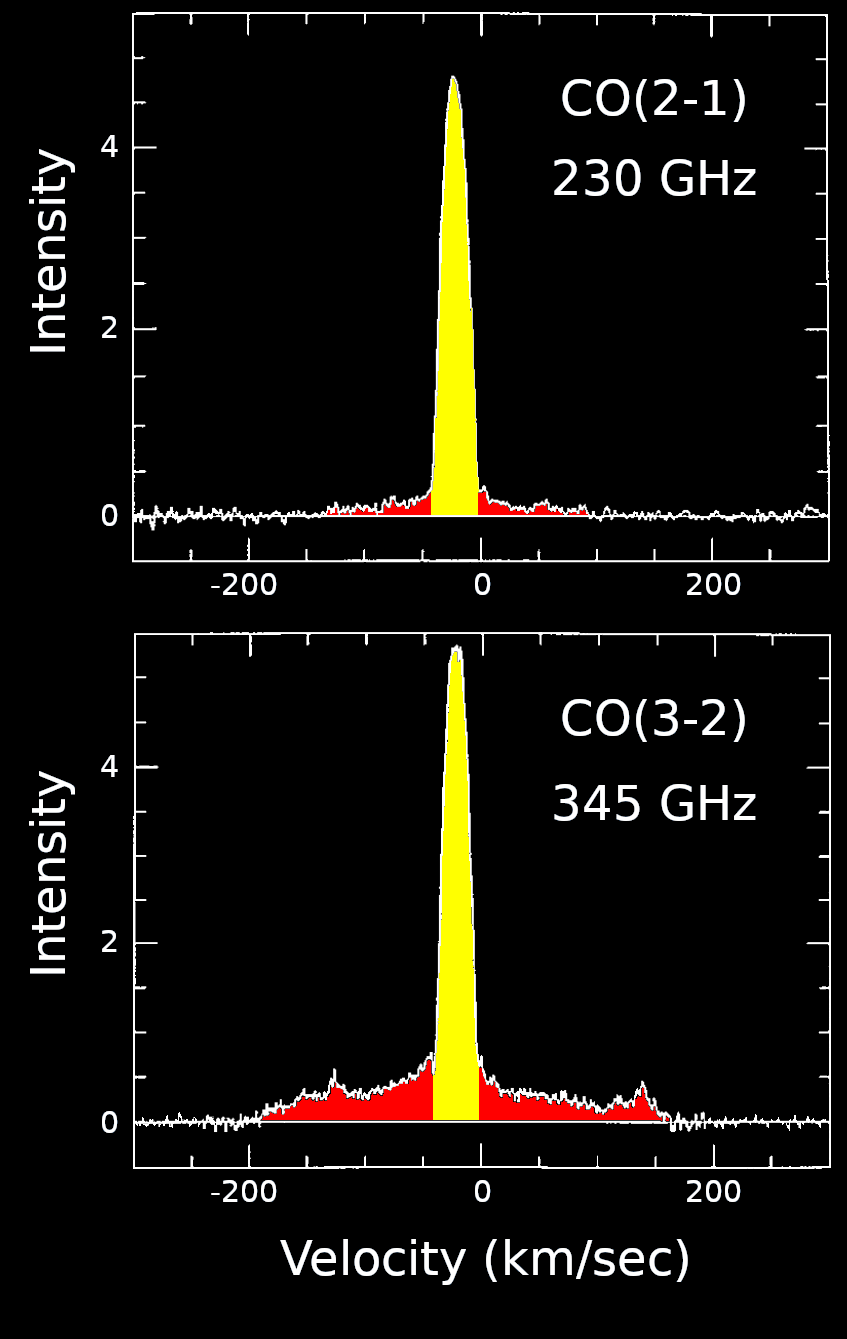
Two spectra of carbon monoxide in the Westbrook Nebula are shown. The component shown in yellow arises from the slow wind from the star's AGB phase. The component shown in red is from the faster wind expelled after the star left the AGB. Adapted from Gammie et al.

This nebula began to form about 200 years ago, and primarily consists of molecular gas. The outer part of the nebula is the result of interaction between rapid bipolar outflow and the gas that was ejected when the star was passing through its asymptotic giant branch phase. The lobes are inclined about 24° to the line of sight. The energy being radiated from the nebula consists of scattered light from the star at the core, light being emitted from a compact HII region surrounding the star, and energy from the shock-excited gas in the lobes.

The dynamics of the molecular gas envelope can be studied by examining microwave emission-line spectra from carbon monoxide rotational transitions. These spectra show two distinct velocity components. The narrow cores of the spectral lines show the familiar parabolic profile of a slow (20 km/sec), high optical depth stellar wind from an Asymptotic Giant Branch (AGB) star. This material was expelled before the object became a protoplanetary nebula and constitutes the bulk of the nebula's mass. A second component arising from the far faster post-AGB wind is also visible. The fast (>190 km/sec) wind component becomes more prominent in higher frequency, higher energy spectral lines, because the fast wind has a higher temperature than the slow AGB wind.

The central star is believed to be of spectral class B0 and has 12,200 times the solar luminosity of the sun. The photosphere of this star is now hot enough to have begun ionizing the nebula, and the ionization region is expanding rapidly. The size and rate of growth indicates that ionization began around the year 1971. Once a sizeable portion of the nebula has been ionized, it will have become a planetary nebula. This means the Westbrook Nebula is at a somewhat more advanced evolutionary stage than the Egg Nebula, whose spectral class F5 star has not yet begun to ionize the nebula material.
