= United States Air Force Infrared Sky Surveys =

Early astronomical surveys in the infrared

In the early decades of the Cold War, especially after the launch of Sputnik 1, the United States Air Force (USAF) became interested in methods for detecting and tracking ballistic missiles and satellites. These objects radiate primarily in the infrared, so it was natural to try to detect their infrared signatures. However the infrared appearance of a rocket being launched is very different than that of a satellite in orbit, so the Air Force wanted a suite of infrared detectors that would cover much of the infrared part of the spectrum. Additionally, the Air Force needed to know what permanent background sources were in the sky, to allow discrimination of target from background. Astronomical sources could also be used for detector calibration. Astronomers had not yet mapped the infrared sky, and much of the infrared radiation could not pass through the atmosphere and be observed from the ground. The Air Force began a program that ran from the mid-1960s, through the 1970s and into the 1980s to map the sky at several different infrared wavelengths. The US Department of Defense called this mapping program Infrared Celestial Backgrounds. This program produced the AFCRL, AFGL and RAFGL catalogs.

Although the USAF mapping efforts overlapped in time with the data collection for the Two-Micron Sky Survey (IRC), the IRC catalog was published six years before the first USAF results were officially made public. However the IRC survey was a ground-based effort at a single near-infrared band, and the USAF surveys were sub-orbital space-based multi-band surveys covering the mid and far-infrared.

== CRL catalog ==
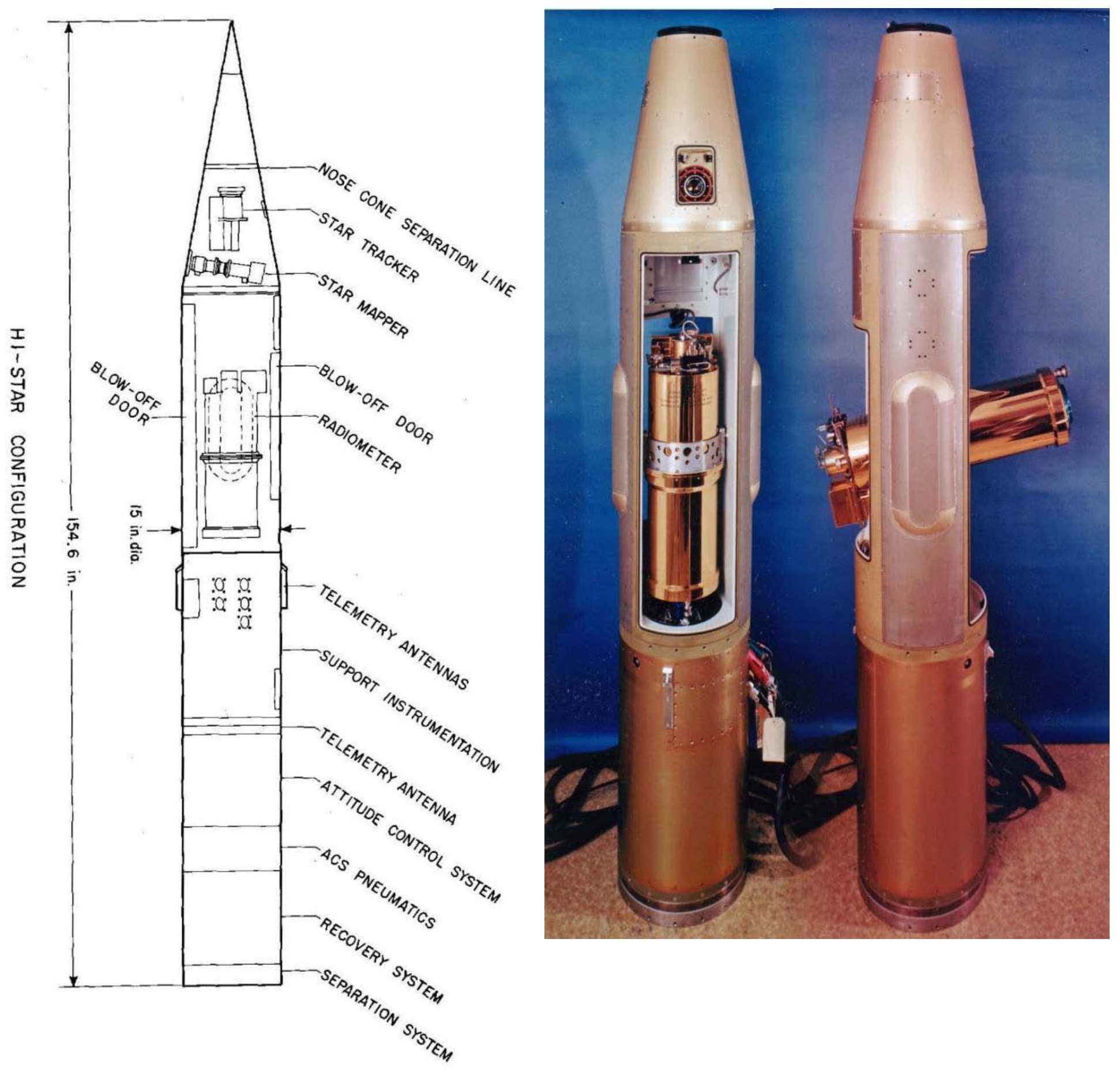
At left a schematic of the rocket payload is shown. The rightmost photograph shows the survey telescope tilted off-axis, as was done when the data was acquired. Illustration from Price (2008)

The AFCRL Infrared Sky Survey was published in 1975, and contained 3198 astronomical sources. AFCRL stands for Air Force Cambridge Research Laboratories. Those laboratories were originally in Cambridge, Massachusetts, but were moved in 1955 to Hanscom Air Force Base and were later renamed the Air Force Geophysics Laboratory (AFGL). The catalog's detections are labelled with a "CRL" number, and several well-known objects, such as CRL 618 (the Westbrook Nebula) and CRL 2688 (the Egg Nebula) are usually referred to by their CRL numbers in astronomical literature. Between 1965 and 1975, the Infrared Physics Branch of the AFCRL Optical Physics Laboratory flew 12 Aerobee 170 sounding rockets devoted to infrared astronomy. Data from seven rocket flights from April 1971 through December 1972 were used to produce the AFCRL catalog. The flights that collected data for the AFCRL were launched form White Sands Missile Range in the Earth's northern hemisphere, so the southernmost region of the sky was not observed.

The science payload of these rockets consisted of an f/3 Gregorian telescope, developed by Hughes Aircraft, with a 16.5 cm primary mirror. The telescope's focal plane had three sets of eight photoconductors: one set of eight Ge:Hg (germanium doped with mercury) detectors with filters to cover the 3 - 5 micron band, one set of Ge:Hg detectors filtered to cover 8 - 14 microns and one set of Ge:Cd detectors filtered to cover 16-22 microns. The effective wavelengths of the detectors were 4.2, 11.0 and 19.8 microns.The entire science package was cooled to 5.5 K using super-critical helium. Each Aerobee rocket flight allowed data to be collected for 200 to 300 seconds. During data acquisition, the telescope was tilted off of the rocket's longitudinal axis, and the rocket rolled at 37.5° per second to allow the telescope to scan a strip of the sky.

== AFGL catalog ==
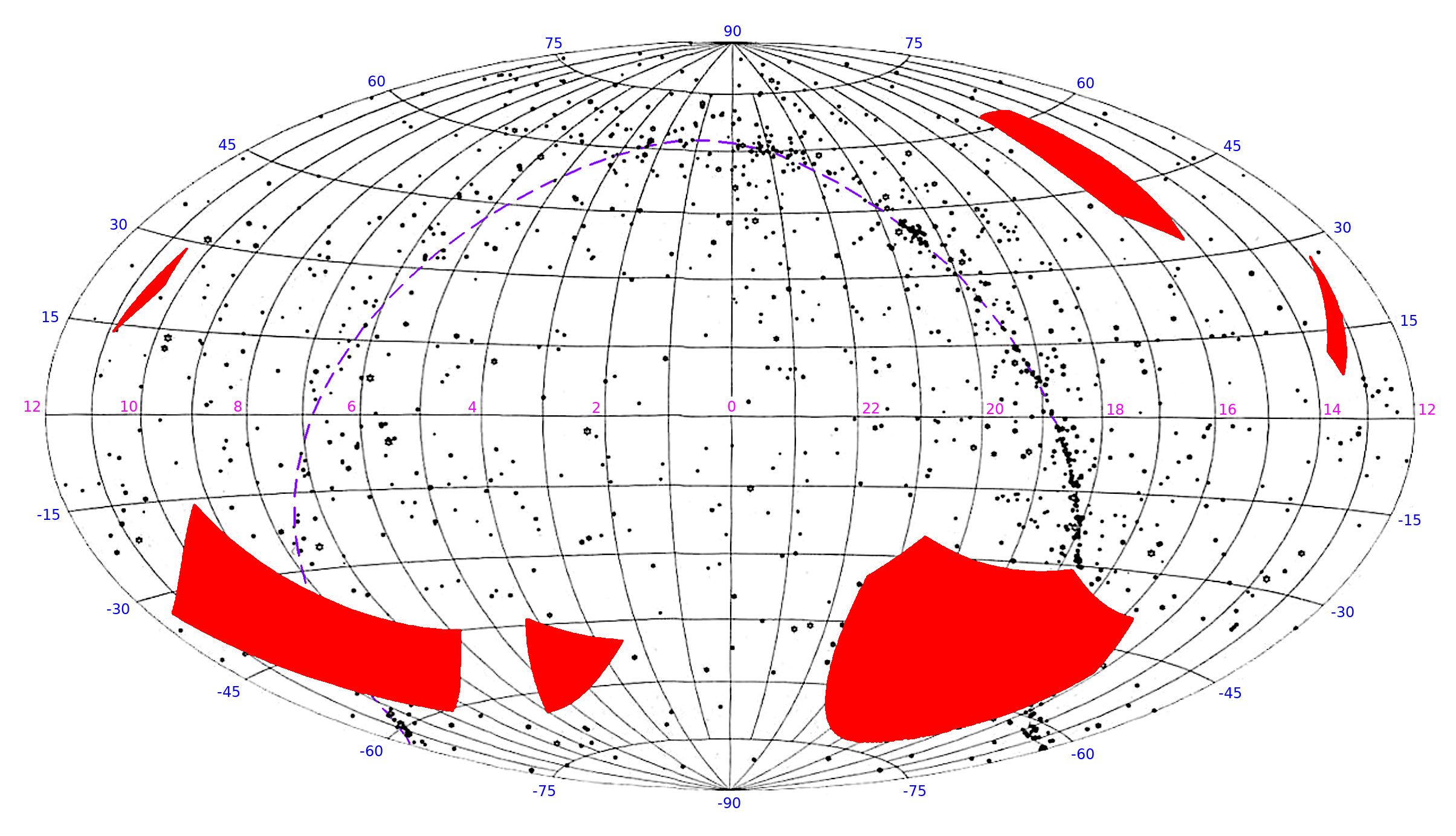
The distribution on the celestial sphere of the sources detected in the AFGL survey in the 11 micron band (black dots). The red areas were not observed. The dashed purple line shows the galactic plane, towards which the sources are concentrated. Adapted from Price (2008)

The AFGL Four Color Infrared Sky Survey: Catalog of Observations at 4.2, 11.0, 19.8 and 27.4 μm was published in 1976. It contained 2363 sources. This catalog added to the AFCRL catalog, by including data collected from rocket flights launched from Woomera, South Australia, allowing data from the southern region of the sky to be gathered. The main modification made to the science payload for these flights was the replacement of the 4.2 micron detectors with Si:P detectors filtered to cover 24-30 microns, with an effective wavelength of 27.4 microns. The original 11.0 and 19.8 detectors were replaced with more sensitive Si:As detectors. Three flights were flown in Australia between September 4th and 17th of 1974. When combined with the flights from White Sands, the total survey covered 90% of the sky in the 11.0 and 19.8 bands.

The AFGL Four Color Infrared Sky Survey: Supplement Catalog was published in 1977. It contains some sources which were eliminated during the final stage of data processing for the AFGL catalog, and were therefor not included in the AFGL. After the publication of the AFGL, private correspondences and journal publications showed that some of those rejected sources were real. The supplement contains the sources that had been rejected, with the caveat that a high number of false detections are present in the supplement's list.

== RAFGL catalog ==
The Revised AFGL Infrared Sky Survey Catalog, was published in 1983. Many spurious detections published in the AFGL catalog were removed from this catalog. Also, for AFGL objects that had subsequently been detected in ground-based observations, improved positions were given.

Sources which appear in more than one of these catalogs are numbered consistently so, for example, the Egg Nebula is CRL 2688, AFGL 2688 and RAFGL 2688.

The Air Force's mapping program was terminated in the early 1980s because the Strategic Defense Initiative swept up much of the funding and the IRAS satellite provided a much more sensitive survey of the infrared sky.
