= Protoplanetary nebula =

Nebula surrounding a dying star

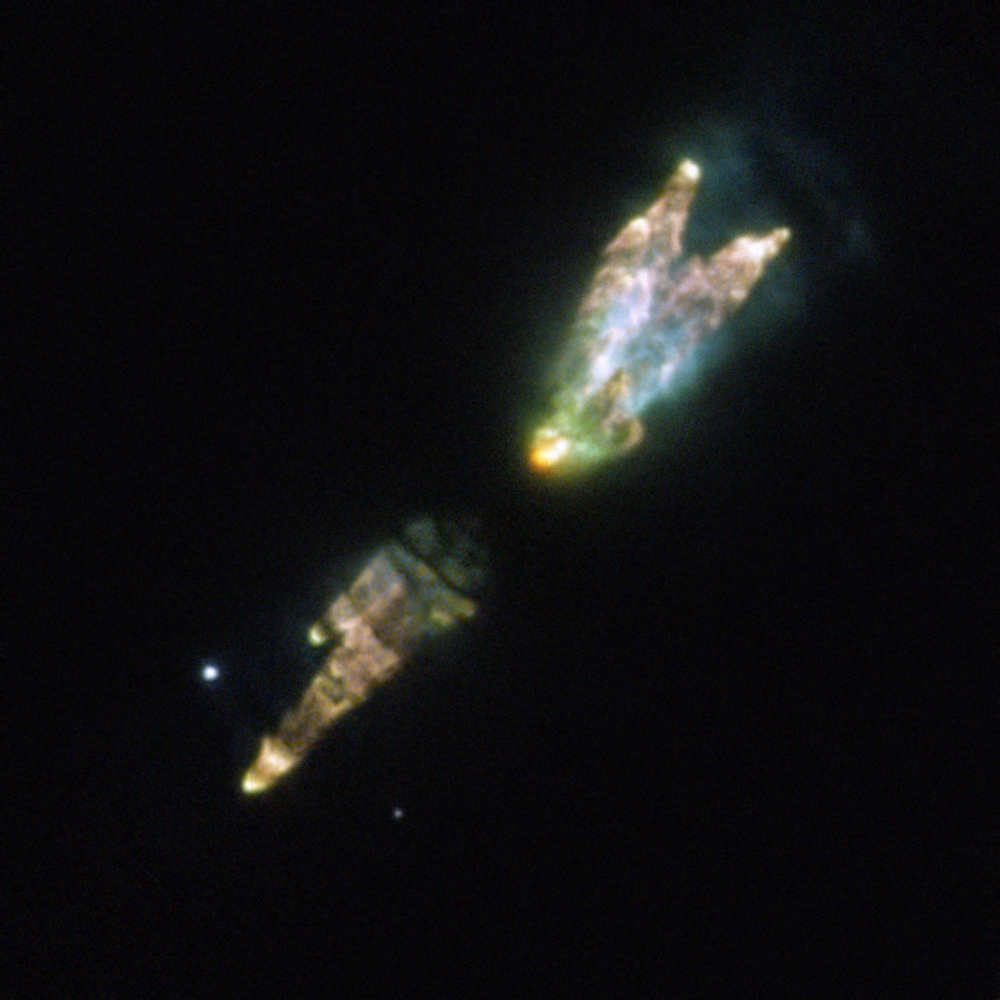
The Westbrook Nebula, a protoplanetary nebula.

A protoplanetary nebula or preplanetary nebula (PPN, plural PPNe) is an astronomical object which is at the short-lived episode during a star's rapid evolution between the late asymptotic giant branch (LAGB)^{[a]} phase and the subsequent planetary nebula (PN) phase. A PPN emits strongly in infrared radiation, and is a kind of reflection nebula. It is the second-from-the-last high-luminosity evolution phase in the life cycle of intermediate-mass stars (1–8 M_{☉}).

== Naming ==
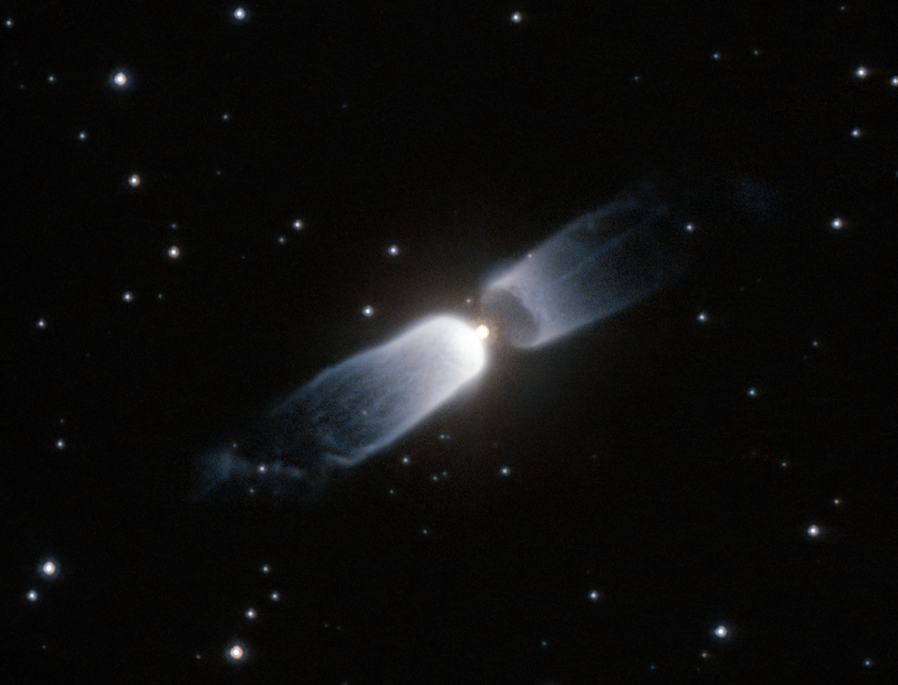
Protoplanetary nebula IRAS 13208-6020 is formed from material that is shed by a central star.

The name protoplanetary nebula is an unfortunate choice due to the possibility of confusion with the same term being sometimes employed when discussing the unrelated concept of protoplanetary disks. The name protoplanetary nebula is a consequence of the older term planetary nebula, which was chosen due to early astronomers looking through telescopes and finding a similarity in appearance of planetary nebula to the gas giants such as Neptune and Uranus. To avoid any possible confusion, Sahai, Sánchez Contreras & Morris 2005 suggested employing a new term preplanetary nebula which does not overlap with any other disciplines of astronomy. They are often referred to as post-AGB stars, although that category also includes stars that will never ionize their ejected matter.

== Evolution ==
=== Protoplanetary nebula phase ===
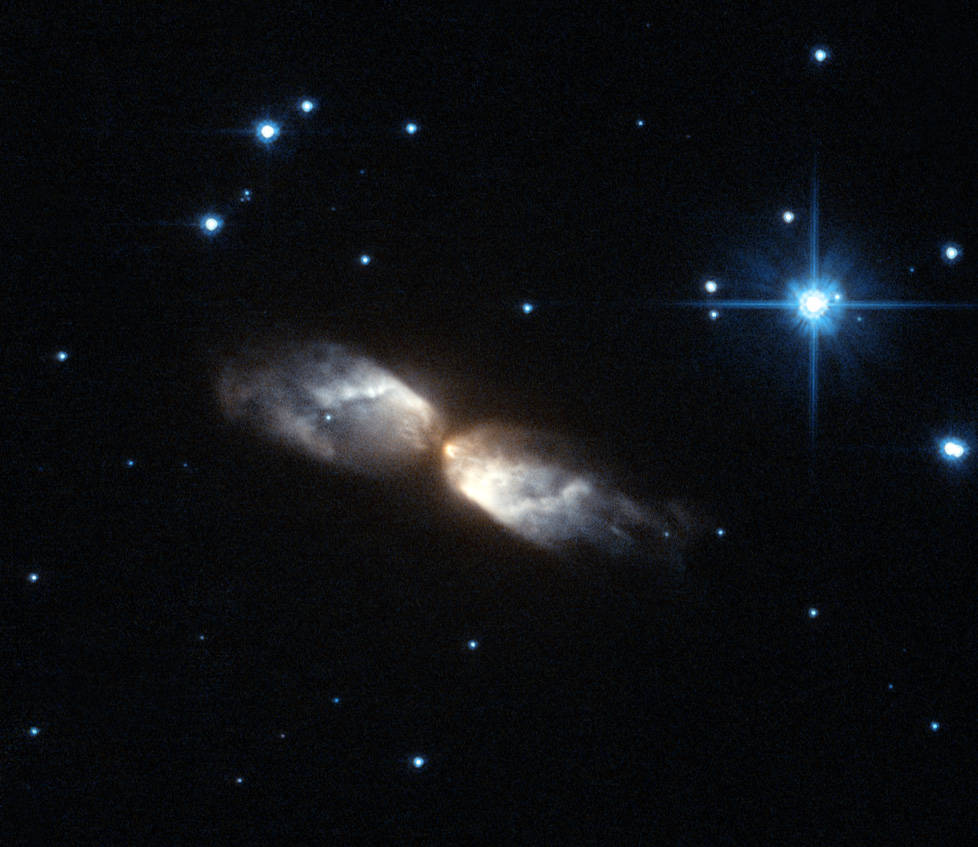
Protoplanetary nebula known as IRAS 20068+4051 taken by Hubble's Advanced Camera for Surveys.

During the ensuing protoplanetary nebula phase, the central star's effective temperature will continue rising as a result of the envelope's mass loss as a consequence of the hydrogen shell's burning. During this phase, the central star is still too cool to ionize the slow-moving circumstellar shell ejected during the preceding AGB phase. However, the star does appear to drive high-velocity, collimated winds which shape and shock this shell, and almost certainly entrain slow-moving AGB ejecta to produce a fast molecular wind. Observations and high-resolution imaging studies from 1998 to 2001, demonstrate that the rapidly evolving PPN phase ultimately shapes the morphology of the subsequent PN. At a point during or soon after the AGB envelope detachment, the envelope shape changes from roughly spherically symmetric to axially symmetric. The resultant morphologies are bipolar, knotty jets and Herbig–Haro-like "bow shocks". These shapes appear even in relatively "young" PPNe. (Davis et al. 2005)

=== End ===
The PPN phase continues until the central star reaches around 30,000 K and it is hot enough (producing enough ultraviolet radiation) to ionize the circumstellar nebula (ejected gases) and it becomes a kind of emission nebula called a Planetary Nebula. This transition must take place in less than around 10,000 years or else the density of the circumstellar envelope will fall below the PN formulation density threshold of around 100 per cm^{3} and no PN will result, such a case is sometimes referred to as a 'lazy planetary nebula'. (Volk & Kwok 1989)

== Recent conjectures ==
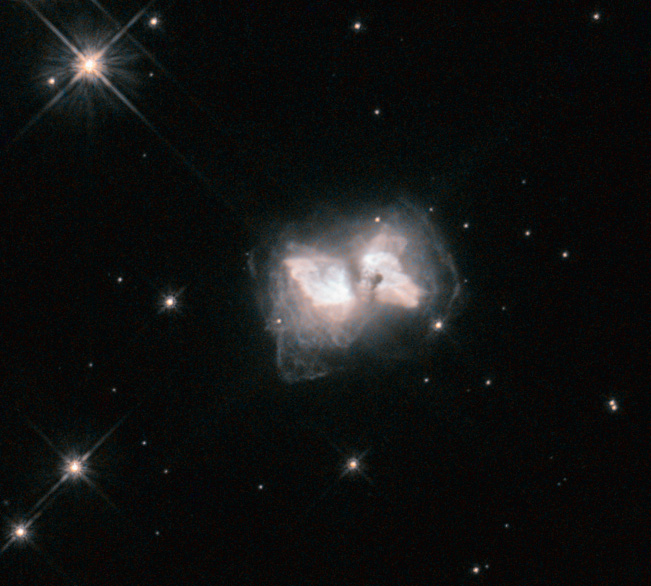
An interstellar butterfly - protoplanetary nebula Roberts 22

Bujarrabal et al. (2001) found that the "interacting stellar winds" model of Kwok et al. (1978) of radiatively-driven winds is insufficient to account for their CO observations of PPN fast winds which imply high momentum and energy inconsistent with that model. Complementarily, theorists (Soker & Livio 1994; Reyes-Ruiz & Lopez 1999; Soker & Rappaport 2000; Blackman, Frank & Welch 2001) investigated whether accretion disk scenarios, similar to models used to explain jets from active galactic nuclei and young stars, could account for both the point symmetry and the high degree of collimation seen in many PPN jets. In such models applied to the PPN context, the accretion disk forms through binary interactions. Magneto-centrifugal launching from the disk surface is then a way to convert gravitational energy into the kinetic energy of a fast wind in these systems. If the accretion-disk jet paradigm is correct and magneto-hydrodynamics (MHD) processes mediate the energetics and collimation of PPN outflows, then they will also determine physics of the shocks in these flows, and this can be confirmed with high-resolution pictures of the emission regions that go with the shocks. (Davis et al. 2005)

== See also ==
- Bipolar nebula
- Bipolar outflow
- List of protoplanetary nebulae
- Planetary nebula
- List of planetary nebulae

== Notes ==
1. The late asymptotic giant branch begins at the point on the asymptotic giant branch (AGB) where a star is no longer observable in visible light and becomes an infrared object. (Volk & Kwok 1989)
