= Sharpless catalog =

Made of a list

- Related media on Commons

The Sharpless catalog is a list of 313 H II regions (emission nebulae) intended to be comprehensive north of declination −27°. (It does include some nebulae south of that declination as well.) The first edition was published in 1953 with 142 objects (Sh1), and the second and final version was published by US astronomer Stewart Sharpless in 1959 with 312 objects. Sharpless also includes some planetary nebulae and supernova remnants, in addition to H II regions.

In 1953 Stewart Sharpless joined the staff of the United States Naval Observatory Flagstaff Station, where he surveyed and cataloged H II regions of the Milky Way using the images from the Palomar Sky Survey. From this work Sharpless published his catalog of H II regions in two editions: the first in 1953, with 142 nebulae; and the second and final edition in 1959, with 312 nebulae.

Sharpless coordinates are based on the star catalogs Bonner Durchmusterung (BD) and Cordoba Durchmusterung (CD), but the second release was adjusted to the 1900 epoch.

In the second release, some coordinates for southern hemisphere regions have an uncertainty over 1 minute of arc. This can make them difficult to find, so a revised catalog called BFS (Blitz, Fich and Stark) was released with 65 new regions and about 20 removals. Most of the removed items were the aforementioned nebula or remnants.

The 312 items in Sharpless sometimes overlap with the 110 Messier objects (M), 7,840 objects in the New General Catalogue (NGC), the Caldwell catalogue (itself a "best of" from other catalogues, with 109 items), and the RCW catalog. Contemporary catalogs were Gum and RCW, but they mainly covered the southern hemisphere.

== Table ==
Table of second Sharpless (1958 version) catalog; click on image for image credit, most of which are either various amateur astronomers, the ESO, ESA, or NASA

Sh2 No.	common name	Images	Names and designations
Sh 2-1			
Sh 2-3	RCW 120		
Sh 2-4			
Sh 2-5			
Sh 2-6	Bug Nebula		Sh2-6, NGC 6302, Bug Nebula, PK 349+01 1, Butterfly Nebula, RCW 124, Gum 60, Caldwell 69
Sh 2-8	NGC 6334		ESO 392-EN 009, Sharpless 8, RCW 127, Gum 64, NGC 6334
Sh 2-9	Gum 65		
Sh 2-10	RCW 130		
Sh 2-11	War and Peace Nebula		Sh2-11, NGC 6357, RCW 131, Gum 66, War and Peace Nebula
Sh 2-12			
Sh 2-17		RCW 138 DECaPS DR2	
Sh 2-20			
Sh 2-21			
Sh 2-25	Lagoon Nebula		Sh2 25, RCW 146, Gum 72, Messier 8
Sh 2-27			
Sh 2-29	Sharpless 29		Sh2 29, NGC 6559
Sh 2-30	Trifid Nebula		Sh2 30, Messier 20, NGC 6514, RCW 147, Gum 76
Sh 2-31			
Sh 2-34	Forgotten Nebula		Gum 77, RCW 149, LBN 38
Sh 2-37	Twiddlebug Nebula		Gum 78, IC 1283/4, RCW 153, LBN 47
Sh 2-41			LBN 51
Sh 2-42			
Sh 2-44			
Sh 2-45	Omega Nebula		Omega Nebula, Messier 17, NGC 6618, Swan Nebula, Sharpless 45, RCW 160, Gum 81
Sh 2-46			
Sh 2-49	Eagle Nebula		Sh2 49, Messier 16, NGC 6611, RCW 165, Gum 83
Sh 2-54			
Sh 2-64	W 40		Sh2 64, RCW 174
Sh 2-68			
Sh 2-71			
Sh 2-80	M1-67		
Sh 2-82			
Sh 2-86			
Sh 2-88			
Sh 2-92	SNR G65.3+5.7		
Sh 2-101	Tulip Nebula		Sharpless 101, Cygnus Star Cloud
Sh 2-105	Crescent Nebula		Sh2 105, NGC 6888, Sharpless 105, Caldwell 27
Sh 2-106	Celestial Snow Angel		Sh2-106, Celestial Snow Angel
Sh 2-112			
Sh 2-113	Flying Dragon Nebula		
Sh 2-114			
Sh 2-115			
Sh 2-117	North America Nebula		NGC 7000, Caldwell 20
Sh 2-125	Cocoon Nebula		IC 5146, Caldwell 19
Sh 2-126			
Sh 2-129			
Sh 2-131	Elephant's Trunk Nebula		
Sh 2-132			
Sh 2-136	Ghost Nebula		
Sh 2-140	Sh2-140		Sh2-140
Sh 2-142	NGC 7380		
Sh 2-155	Cave Nebula		Sh2-155, Caldwell 9
Sh 2-157			
Sh 2-158	NGC 7538		Sh2-158, NGC 7538
Sh 2-162	Bubble Nebula		Sh2-162, NGC 7635, Bubble nebula
Sh 2-170	Little Rosette Nebula		Sh2-170, LBN 577, Little Rosette Nebula
Sh 2-171	NGC 7822		Sh2-171, NGC 7822
Sh 2-174			
Sh 2-184	NGC 281		NGC 281, IC 11
Sh 2-185			
Sh 2-188	Simeis 22		
Sh 2-190	Heart Nebula		
Sh 2-191	Maffei 1		Sh2-191, Maffei 1, PGC 9892
Sh 2-197	Maffei 2		Sh2-197, Maffei 2, UGCA 39,PGC 10217,
Sh 2-199	Soul Nebula		Sh2-199, LBN 667, Soul Nebula, IC 1848 (cluster only)
Sh 2-201			
Sh 2-211, Sh 2-212	Tribble Nebulae		NGC 1624, Sh2-211, Sh2-212
Sh 2-216			
Sh 2-220	California Nebula		NGC 1499, Sharpless 220
Sh 2-222	NGC 1579		
Sh 2-229	Flaming Star Nebula		Flaming Star Nebula, Caldwell 31, IC 405, Sh2-229
Sh 2-230			
Sh 2-232			
Sh 2-237	NGC 1931		Sharpless 237
Sh 2-238	Hind's Nebula		NGC 1555, Hind's Nebula, Sharpless 238
Sh 2-239			
Sh 2-240	Simeis 147		
Sh 2-244	Crab Nebula		Messier 1, NGC 1952,
Sh 2-248	Jellyfish Nebula		IC 443, Sh2-248, Jellyfish Nebula
Sh 2-260			
Sh 2-261			
Sh 2-263			
Sh 2-264			
Sh 2-273	NGC 2264		
Sh 2-274	Medusa Nebula		
Sh 2-275	Rosette Nebula		Sh2-275, CTB 21
Sh 2-276	Barnard's Loop		Sh2-276, Barnard's Loop
Sh 2-277	Flame Nebula		Sh2-271, NGC 2024
Sh 2-279	Running Man Nebula		NGC 1973, NGC 1975, NGC 1977
Sh 2-281	Orion Nebula		Messier 42, NGC 1976, LBN 974
Sh 2-282			
Sh 2-284			
Sh 2-290	Abell 31		
Sh 2-292	Seagull Nebula		
Sh 2-297			Ced 90, LBN 1039
Sh 2-298	Thor's Helmet		Thor's Helmet, Gum 4, Sharpless 298, NGC 2359
Sh 2-302	RCW 7		
Sh 2-308			
Sh 2-311	NGC 2467		
Sh 2-313	Abell 35		

== List ==
- Sh 2-1
- Sh 2-2
- Sh 2-3
- Sh 2-4
- Sh 2-5
- Sh 2-6
- Sh 2-7
- Sh 2-8
- Sh 2-9
- Sh 2-10
- Sh 2-11
- Sh 2-12
- Sh 2-13
- Sh 2-14
- Sh 2-15
- Sh 2-16
- Sh 2-17
- Sh 2-18
- Sh 2-19
- Sh 2-20
- Sh 2-21
- Sh 2-22
- Sh 2-23
- Sh 2-24
- Sh 2-25
- Sh 2-26
- Sh 2-27
- Sh 2-28
- Sh 2-29
- Sh 2-30
- Sh 2-31
- Sh 2-32
- Sh 2-33
- Sh 2-34
- Sh 2-35
- Sh 2-36
- Sh 2-37
- Sh 2-38
- Sh 2-39
- Sh 2-40
- Sh 2-41
- Sh 2-42
- Sh 2-43
- Sh 2-44
- Sh 2-45
- Sh 2-46
- Sh 2-47
- Sh 2-48
- Sh 2-49
- Sh 2-50
- Sh 2-51
- Sh 2-52
- Sh 2-53
- Sh 2-54
- Sh 2-55
- Sh 2-56
- Sh 2-57
- Sh 2-58
- Sh 2-59
- Sh 2-60
- Sh 2-61
- Sh 2-62
- Sh 2-63
- Sh 2-64
- Sh 2-65
- Sh 2-66
- Sh 2-67
- Sh 2-68
- Sh 2-69
- Sh 2-70
- Sh 2-71
- Sh 2-72
- Sh 2-73
- Sh 2-74
- Sh 2-75
- Sh 2-76
- Sh 2-77
- Sh 2-78
- Sh 2-79
- Sh 2-80
- Sh 2-81
- Sh 2-82
- Sh 2-83
- Sh 2-84
- Sh 2-85
- Sh 2-86
- Sh 2-87
- Sh 2-88
- Sh 2-89
- Sh 2-90
- Sh 2-91
- Sh 2-92
- Sh 2-93
- Sh 2-94
- Sh 2-95
- Sh 2-96
- Sh 2-97
- Sh 2-98
- Sh 2-99
- Sh 2-100
- Sh 2-101
- Sh 2-102
- Sh 2-103
- Sh 2-104
- Sh 2-105
- Sh 2-106
- Sh 2-107
- Sh 2-108
- Sh 2-109
- Sh 2-110
- Sh 2-111
- Sh 2-112
- Sh 2-113
- Sh 2-114
- Sh 2-115
- Sh 2-116
- Sh 2-117
- Sh 2-118
- Sh 2-119
- Sh 2-120
- Sh 2-121
- Sh 2-122
- Sh 2-123
- Sh 2-124
- Sh 2-125
- Sh 2-126
- Sh 2-127
- Sh 2-128
- Sh 2-129
- Sh 2-130
- Sh 2-131
- Sh 2-132
- Sh 2-133
- Sh 2-134
- Sh 2-135
- Sh 2-136
- Sh 2-137
- Sh 2-138
- Sh 2-139
- Sh 2-140
- Sh 2-141
- Sh 2-142
- Sh 2-143
- Sh 2-144
- Sh 2-145
- Sh 2-146
- Sh 2-147
- Sh 2-148
- Sh 2-149
- Sh 2-150
- Sh 2-151
- Sh 2-152
- Sh 2-153
- Sh 2-154
- Sh 2-155
- Sh 2-156
- Sh 2-157
- Sh 2-158
- Sh 2-159
- Sh 2-160
- Sh 2-161
- Sh 2-162
- Sh 2-163
- Sh 2-164
- Sh 2-165
- Sh 2-166
- Sh 2-167
- Sh 2-168
- Sh 2-169
- Sh 2-170
- Sh 2-171
- Sh 2-172
- Sh 2-173
- Sh 2-174
- Sh 2-175
- Sh 2-176
- Sh 2-177
- Sh 2-178
- Sh 2-179
- Sh 2-180
- Sh 2-181
- Sh 2-182
- Sh 2-183
- Sh 2-184
- Sh 2-185
- Sh 2-186
- Sh 2-187
- Sh 2-188
- Sh 2-189
- Sh 2-190
- Sh 2-191
- Sh 2-192
- Sh 2-193
- Sh 2-194
- Sh 2-195
- Sh 2-196
- Sh 2-197
- Sh 2-198
- Sh 2-199
- Sh 2-200
- Sh 2-201
- Sh 2-202
- Sh 2-203
- Sh 2-204
- Sh 2-205
- Sh 2-206
- Sh 2-207
- Sh 2-208
- Sh 2-209
- Sh 2-210
- Sh 2-211
- Sh 2-212
- Sh 2-213
- Sh 2-214
- Sh 2-215
- Sh 2-216
- Sh 2-217
- Sh 2-218
- Sh 2-219
- Sh 2-220
- Sh 2-221
- Sh 2-222
- Sh 2-223
- Sh 2-224
- Sh 2-225
- Sh 2-226
- Sh 2-227
- Sh 2-228
- Sh 2-229
- Sh 2-230
- Sh 2-231
- Sh 2-232
- Sh 2-233
- Sh 2-234
- Sh 2-235
- Sh 2-236
- Sh 2-237
- Sh 2-238
- Sh 2-239
- Sh 2-240
- Sh 2-241
- Sh 2-242
- Sh 2-243
- Sh 2-244
- Sh 2-245
- Sh 2-246
- Sh 2-247
- Sh 2-248
- Sh 2-249
- Sh 2-250
- Sh 2-251
- Sh 2-252
- Sh 2-253
- Sh 2-254
- Sh 2-255
- Sh 2-256
- Sh 2-257
- Sh 2-258
- Sh 2-259
- Sh 2-260
- Sh 2-261
- Sh 2-262
- Sh 2-263
- Sh 2-264
- Sh 2-265
- Sh 2-266
- Sh 2-267
- Sh 2-268
- Sh 2-269
- Sh 2-270
- Sh 2-271
- Sh 2-272
- Sh 2-273
- Sh 2-274
- Sh 2-275
- Sh 2-276
- Sh 2-277
- Sh 2-278
- Sh 2-279
- Sh 2-280
- Sh 2-281
- Sh 2-282
- Sh 2-283
- Sh 2-284
- Sh 2-285
- Sh 2-286
- Sh 2-287
- Sh 2-288
- Sh 2-289
- Sh 2-290
- Sh 2-291
- Sh 2-292
- Sh 2-293
- Sh 2-294
- Sh 2-295
- Sh 2-296
- Sh 2-297
- Sh 2-298
- Sh 2-299
- Sh 2-300
- Sh 2-301
- Sh 2-302
- Sh 2-303
- Sh 2-304
- Sh 2-305
- Sh 2-306
- Sh 2-307
- Sh 2-308
- Sh 2-309
- Sh 2-310
- Sh 2-311
- Sh 2-312
- Sh 2-313

== Star chart ==
Chart of Sharpless HII regions

== See also ==
- Gum Catalog
- RCW Catalog
- List of star-forming regions in the Local Group
