= Sh 2-23 =

Molecular cloud

Sharpless 2-23
Nebula

Observation data: J2000 epoch
- Right ascension: 16^{h} 13^{m} 24^{s}
- Declination: −8° 22′ 00″
- Distance: 200 pc
- Constellation: Scorpius

Sh 2-23 is a molecular cloud in the constellation Scorpius. It is part of the Sharpless Catalog assembled by Stewart Sharpless. It is located nearby to 16 Scorpii, and may be a faint reflection nebula. It is similar to the nearby Sh 2-24 being that it contains no hydrogen-alpha.
