= Sh 2-216 =

Closest planetary nebulae

Nebula
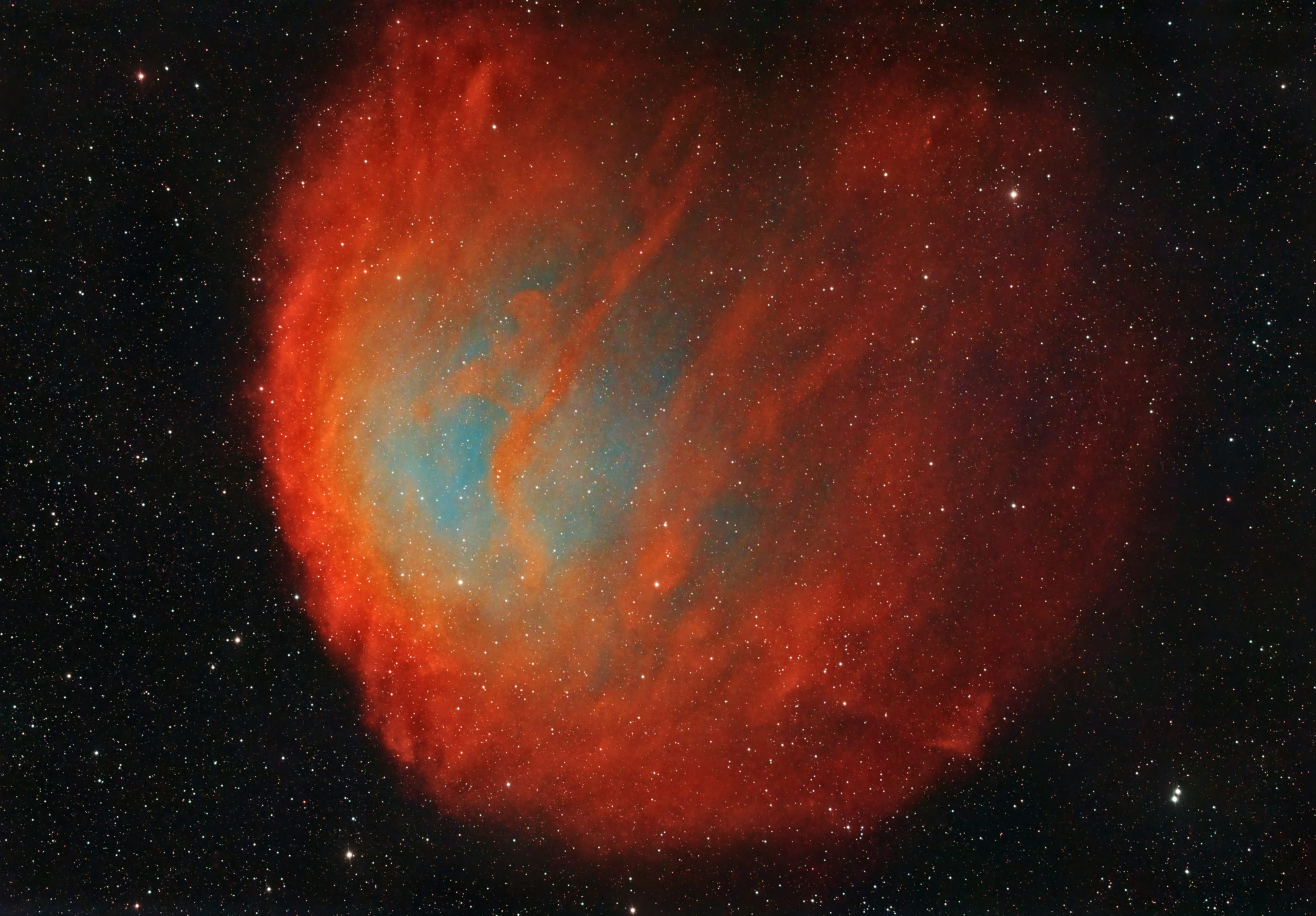
- Sh 2-216, showing its large, diffuse structure and interaction with the interstellar medium.

Observation data: {{{epoch}}} epoch
- Right ascension: 04^{h} 45^{m} 35^{s}
- Declination: +46° 49′ 39″
- Distance: 420 ly (130 pc) ly
- Apparent dimensions (V): 100′
- Notable features: Closest known planetary nebula from Earth
- Designations: Sharpless 216, LBN 744, SIM 1, PK 158+00 1

Sh 2-216 (also known as Sharpless 216) is an ancient planetary nebula located in the constellation Perseus. It is notable for being the closest planetary nebula to Earth, at a distance of approximately 129 pc (420 ly).

== Characteristics ==
Sh 2-216 is one of the oldest known planetary nebulae, with an estimated age of roughly 600,000 years. Due to its advanced age, the nebula is extremely faint and highly dispersed, covering an angular diameter of about 100 arcminutes—more than three times the width of the full Moon.

The nebula is currently interacting with the interstellar medium (ISM). As it moves through space, its eastern edge has become compressed and brightened due to the resistance of surrounding gas, creating a visible bow-shock structure in deep-exposure images.

== Central star ==
The central star of Sh 2-216 is a hot white dwarf designated LS V+46 21 (also known as WD 0441+467). It is a DAO-type white dwarf, exhibiting a spectrum with lines of both hydrogen and helium. Due to the nebula's interaction with the ISM, the central star is no longer located at the geometric center of the nebulosity, as the gas has been decelerated while the star continues its original trajectory.

== Discovery and identification ==
The object was first cataloged by Stewart Sharpless in 1959 in his second catalog of H II regions. It was initially misidentified as an H II region due to its massive size and low surface brightness. Its nature as a planetary nebula was proposed in 1981 based on emission line ratios of nitrogen and sulfur, and the central white dwarf was confirmed in 1985.

== See also ==
- List of planetary nebulae
- Sharpless catalog
