= Sh 2-32 =

Emission nebula

Sharpless 2-32
Emission nebula
- H II region
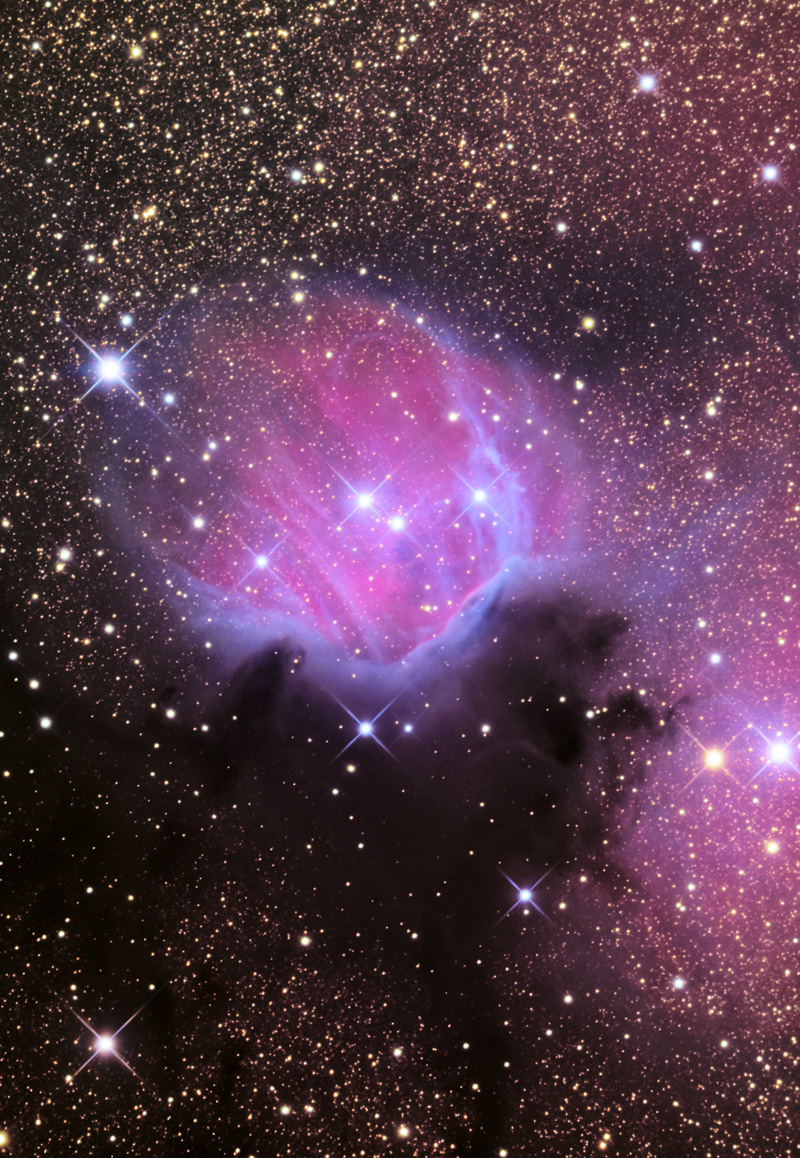
- Sh 2-31 (lower right) and Sh 2-32 (center)

Observation data: J2000 epoch
- Right ascension: 18^{h} 11^{m} 00^{s}
- Declination: −23° 38′ 00″
- Distance: 5940 ly (1800 pc)
- Apparent magnitude (V): 16.21
- Constellation: Sagittarius

Physical characteristics
- Radius: 14 ly
- Designations: IC 1274, LBN 33

Sh 2-32, also known by the designation IC 1274, is an emission nebula in the constellation Sagittarius. It is a major source of gamma rays.

== Discovery ==
Sh 2-32 was discovered, along with nearby Sh 2-29 and Sh 2-31 by John Herschel on 1st July 1826. He listed it as 'h 1996'. In 1833, he re-discovered it, this time labeling it as 'h 3733'. The distinction between the various nebulae of the region would not be established until 1892, when Edward Emerson Barnard photographed that region of the sky.
