= Sh 2-21 =

Emission nebula

Sharpless 2-21
Emission nebula
- H II region
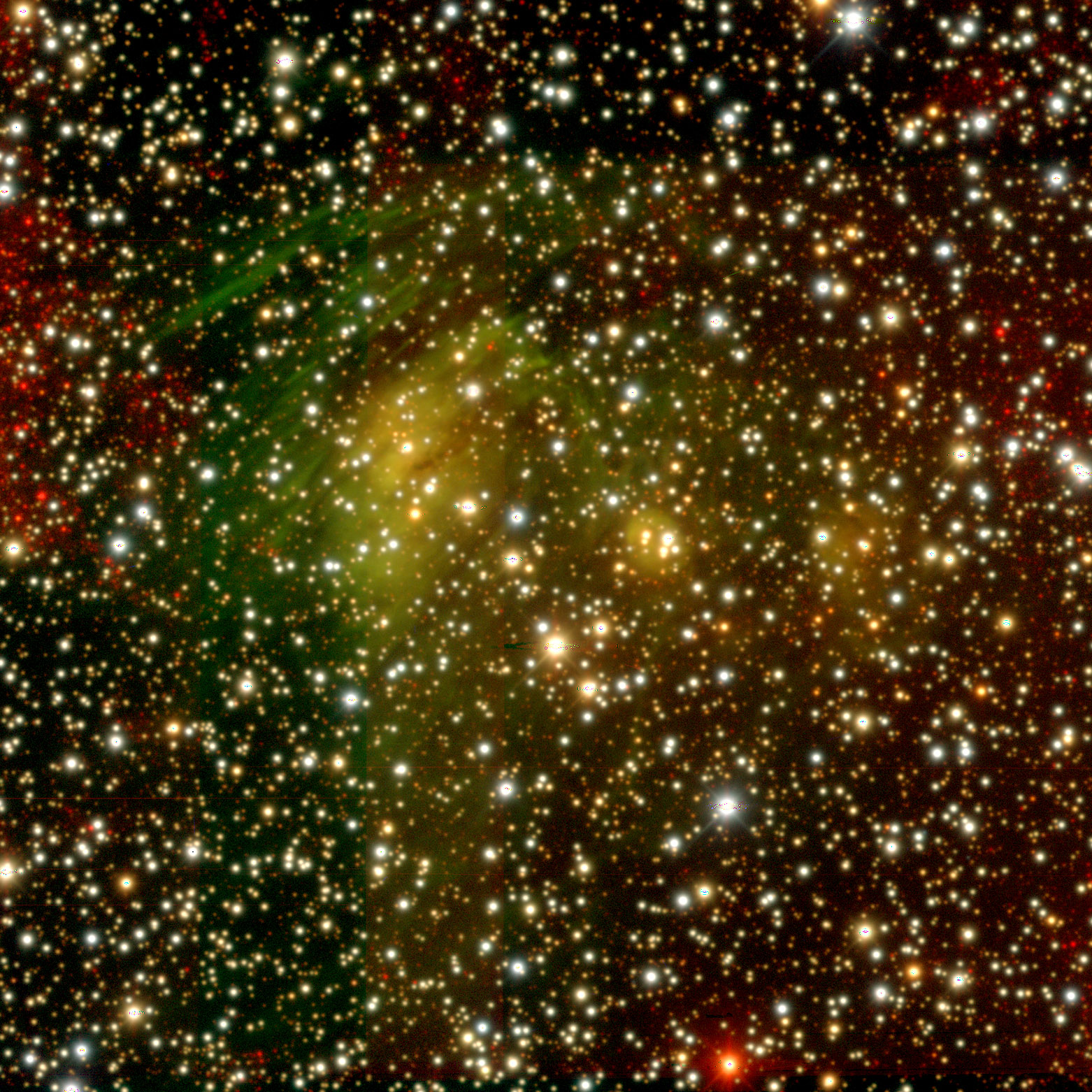
- As seen by the legacy survey

Observation data: J2000 epoch
- Right ascension: 17^{h} 51^{m} 42^{s}
- Declination: −28° 54′ 00″
- Distance: 26100 ly (7600 pc)
- Apparent magnitude (V): 12.15
- Apparent dimensions (V): 10'
- Constellation: Sagittarius

Physical characteristics
- Radius: 38 ly
- Designations: RCW 142, LBN 4

Sh 2-21 is an emission nebula in the constellation Sagittarius. It is part of the Sharpless Catalog assembled by Stewart Sharpless. It is associated with four infrared clusters, [DB2000] 7, [DB2000] 10, [DB2000] 11 and [DB2000] 12. Open cluster Collinder 351 is included as part of the nebula complex.
