= Sh 2-101 =

Nebula

Emission nebula
- H II region
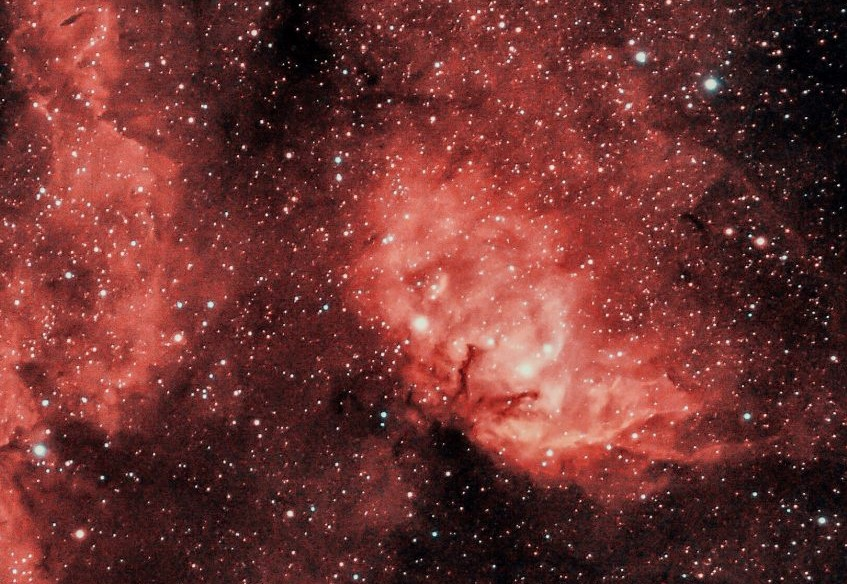
- Sh 2-101

Observation data: J2000.0 epoch
- Right ascension: 20^{h} 00^{m} 29.37^{s}
- Declination: 35° 19′ 13.9″
- Distance: 6,000 ly (1,800 pc)
- Apparent magnitude (V): 9.0
- Apparent dimensions (V): 16' x 9'
- Constellation: Cygnus
- Designations: Sharpless 101, Sh 2-101, Cygnus Star Cloud

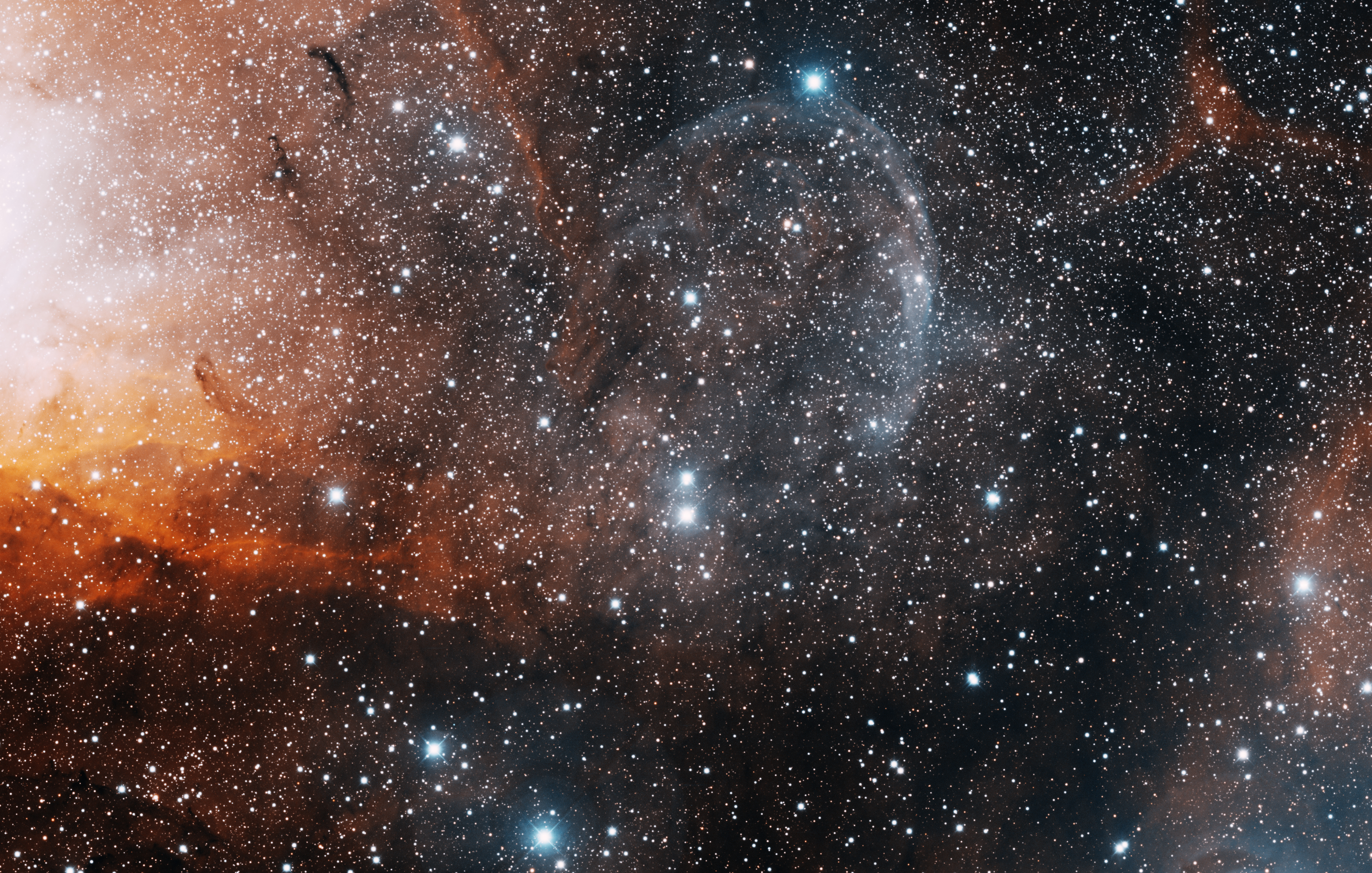
The companion star of the black hole Cygnus X-1 is the brighter of the two stars in the middle of the photo

Sharpless 101 (Sh 2-101) is a H II region emission nebula located in the constellation Cygnus. It is sometimes also called the Tulip Nebula because it appears to resemble the outline of a tulip when imaged photographically. It was catalogued by astronomer Stewart Sharpless in his 1959 catalog of nebulae. It lies at a distance of about 6,000 light-years (5.7×10^{16} km; 3.5×10^{16} mi) from Earth.

Sh 2-101, at least in the field seen from Earth, is in close proximity to microquasar Cygnus X-1, site of one of the first suspected black holes. Cygnus X-1 is located about 15′ west of Sh 2-101. The companion star of Cygnus X-1 is a spectral class O9.7 Iab supergiant with a mass of 21 solar masses and 20 times the radius of the Sun. The period of the binary system is 5.8 days and the pair is separated by 0.2 astronomical units. The black hole has a mass of 15 solar masses and a Schwarzschild radius of 45 km. A bowshock is created by a jet of energetic particles from the black hole as they interact with the interstellar medium. It can be seen as an arc at the top of the photo below.

== See also ==
- Sharpless catalogue
