= Sh 2-78 =

Planetary nebula

Sharpless 2-78
Nebula

Observation data: epoch
- Right ascension: 19^{h} 03^{m} 08^{s}
- Declination: +14° 06′ 58″
- Distance: 2170 ly
- Apparent magnitude (V): 14.0
- Apparent diameter: 27'
- Constellation: Aquila

Physical characteristics
- Radius: 7.6 ly
- Designations: PN G046.8+03.8

Sh 2-78 is a planetary nebula in Aquila.

It was discovered by Stewart Sharpless while assembling his catalogue, and identified as a planetary nebula in 1990. It has a central star with a magnitude of 17. The central star is a variable star, with a variability of 0.3 in magnitude.
