= Sh 2-228 =

H II region in the constellation Auriga

Nebula
- H II region

Observation data: J2000 epoch
- Right ascension: 05^{h} 13^{m} 25.50^{s}
- Declination: +37° 27′ 1.0″
- Constellation: Auriga
- Designations: Sh 2-228, LBN 784, Min 2-58, RAFGL 5137, IRAS 05100+3723, GAL 169.19-00.90

Sh 2-228 (also known as LBN 784) is a compact H II region located in the constellation of Auriga. It is part of the Sharpless catalog of 313 H II regions compiled by American astronomer Stewart Sharpless. The region is believed to split off from the end of a long filamentary cloud roughly 3 million years ago. It is made up of an optical nebula with a compact infrared point source in the center. It is believed to contain a very massive star ALS 19710, which has an intrinsic spectral class of O8V–B0V but is significantly reddened due to extinction by the nebula. Sh 2-228 is located near an infrared star cluster [IBP2002] CC 01 (also known as CC 01), a young open cluster with an estimated mass of about 1800 M_{☉}; the cluster was likely formed by a shock front from Sh 2-228.
