= Sh 2-41 =

Molecular cloud

Sharpless 2-41
Nebula
- As Seen by the European Southern Observatory, 2022

Observation data: J2000 epoch
- Right ascension: 18^{h} 15^{m} 48^{s}
- Declination: −18° 14′ 00″
- Distance: 7180 ly (2200 pc)
- Apparent dimensions (V): 90'
- Constellation: Sagittarius

Physical characteristics
- Radius: 2.2 pc
- Designations: LBN 51

Sh 2-41 is a large nebula in Sagittarius and a component of the Small Sagittarius Star Cloud Sh 2-41 appears near the northern edge of the star cloud.

Sh 2-41 contains multiple smaller components itself. Another Sharpless object, Sh 2-39, is contained within. Sh 2-39 itself contains potential infrared cluster [BDS2003] 6. Dark nebulae Barnard 92 and Barnard 93 are both located within Sh 2-41. These areas are regions of intense star formation. Open cluster Collinder 469 is located just south of Barnard 92, and open cluster Markarian 38 is located just to the south of Barnard 93.
