= Sh 2-42 =

Planetary nebula

Sharpless 2-42
Nebula
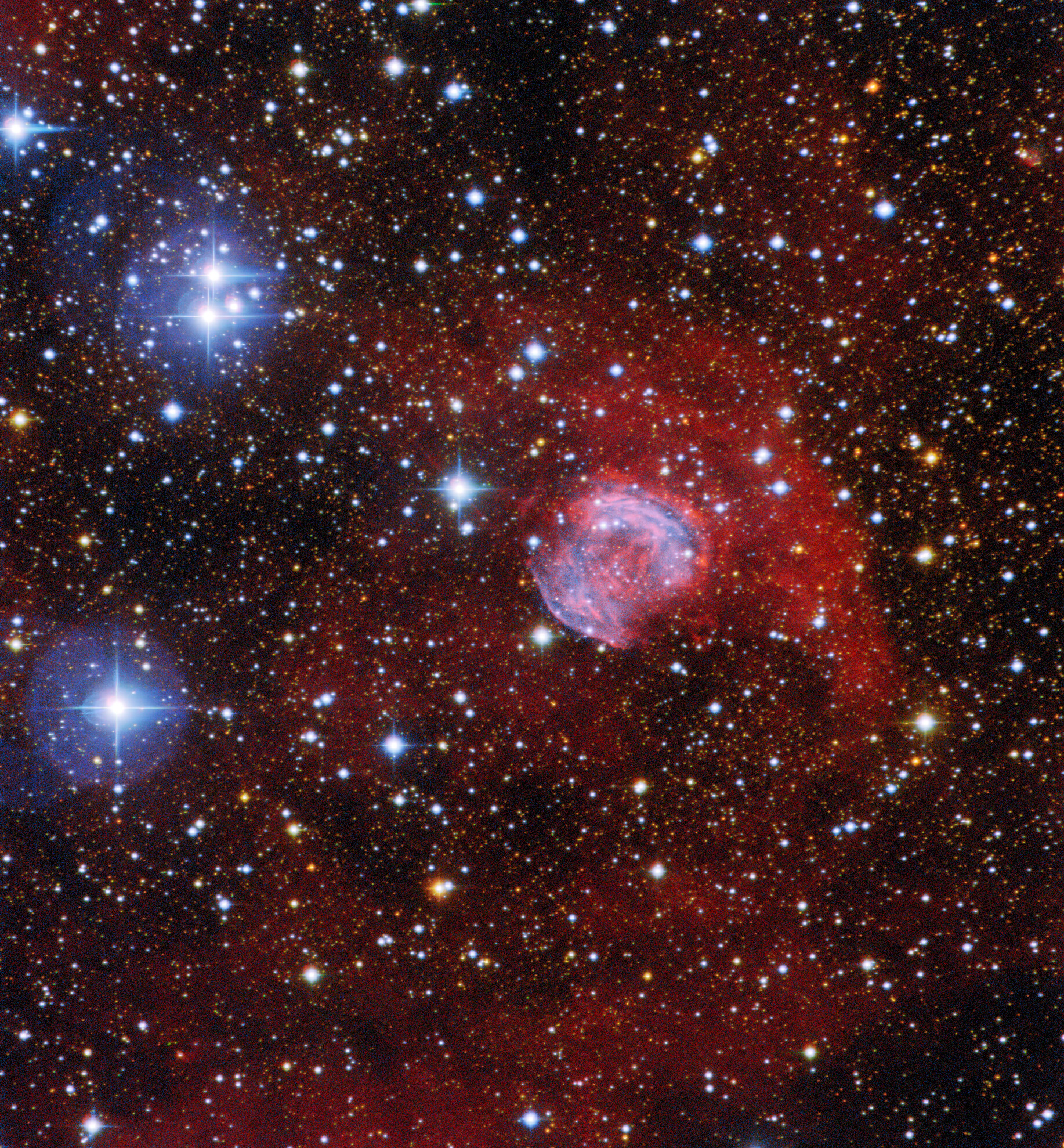
- Image of Sh 2-42 Nebula

Observation data: epoch
- Right ascension: 18^{h} 10^{m} 13^{s}
- Declination: −16° 47′ 49″
- Distance: 4800 ly (2400 pc)
- Apparent dimensions (V): 124" x 118"
- Constellation: Sagittarius
- Designations: G013.3+01.1, PHR1810-1647, PN G013.3+01.1, NVSS J181011-164724

Sh 2-42 is a planetary nebula in Sagittarius. It is included in the Sharpless catalogue, however the position indicated by the original catalogue was one arcminute off. He also originally believed it was an emission nebula. Sh 2-42 is surrounded by a faint halo, extending to a diameter of 6' away from the nebula's center.

The nebula is slightly oval, with a well-defined internal structure. NVSS emission peaked in the brightest part of the shell.
