= Sh 2-2 =

HII Region in Scorpius

Emission nebula
- H II region
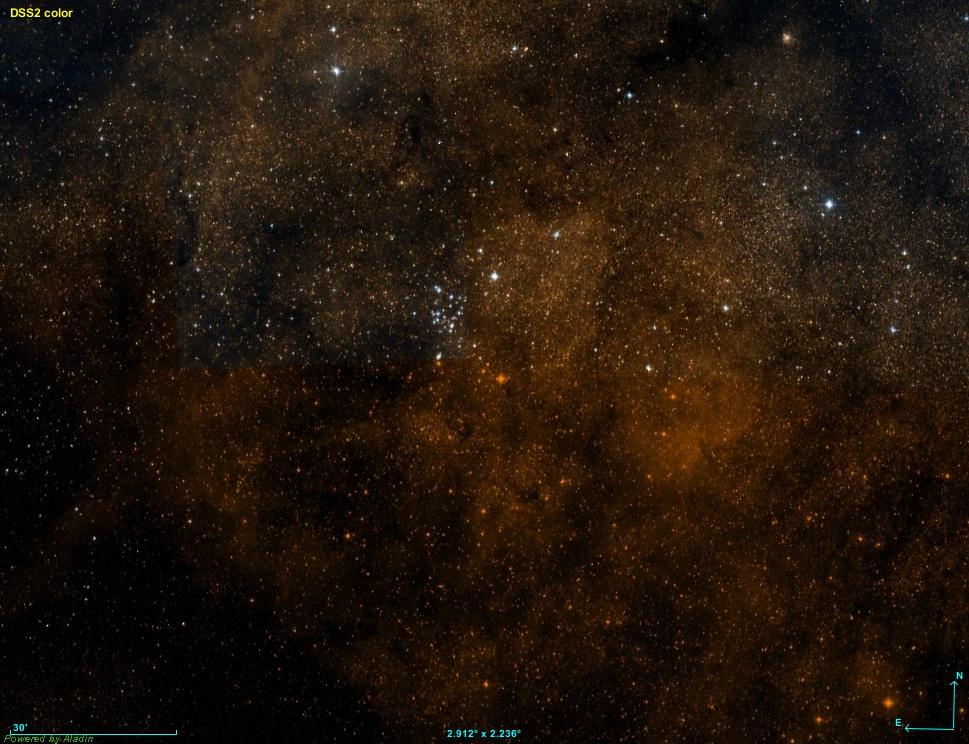
- Image of Sharpless 2

Observation data: J2000 epoch
- Right ascension: 17^{h} 04^{m} 06.6^{s}
- Declination: −38° 08′ 33″
- Apparent dimensions (V): 1°
- Constellation: Scorpius
- Designations: Sh 2-2, Gum 57

Sh 2-2, also known as Sharpless 2, is an emission nebula in the constellation of Scorpius. It appears as a mid-range brightness making it difficult to view. It is believed to currently host an X-ray binary star that originated and was ejected from the Scorpius OB1 association. Amateur astronomers can usually see it with a wide field telescope and a hydrogen-alpha filter.

The nebulous area is fairly large with an irregular shape appearing as a H II region. The remnant has an apparent diameter that covers approximately 60'. It is seen behind the open cluster NGC 6281.
