= Sh 2-14 =

Emission nebula

Sharpless 2-14
Nebula
- H II region
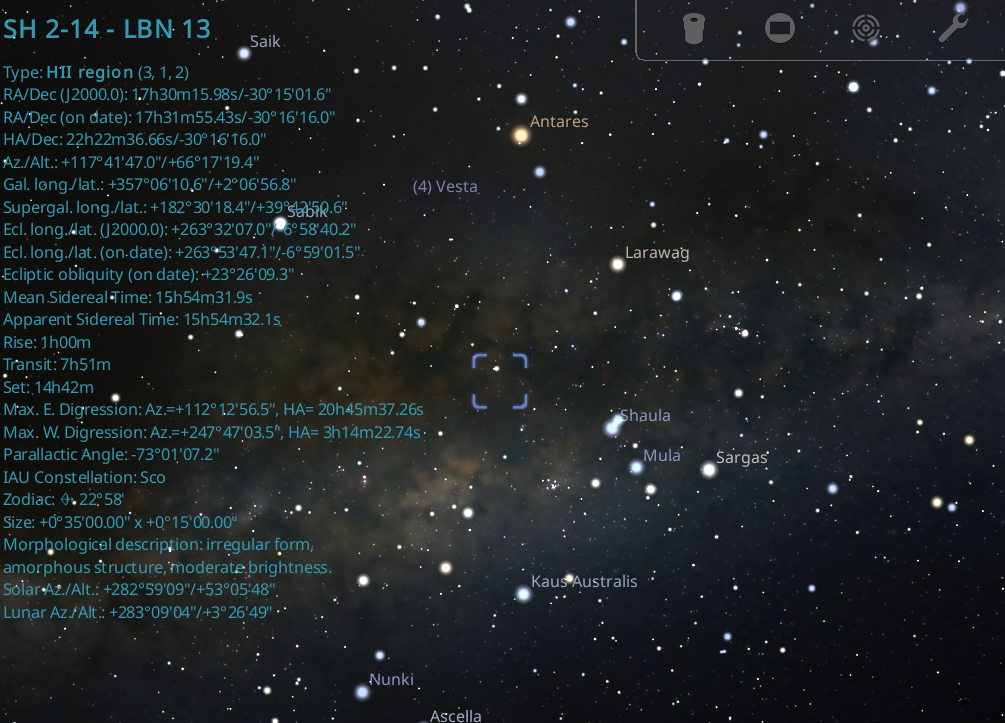
- The location of Sh 2-14 in the sky, (in the open source Stellarium software)

Observation data: epoch
- Right ascension: 17^{h} 30^{m} 18.3^{s}
- Declination: −30° 15′ 46″
- Apparent magnitude (V): 8.02
- Apparent diameter: 2'

Sh 2-14 is an emission nebula in Scorpius. It is ionized by the supergiant HD 158618 and the giant HD 159090. It is possible Stewart Sharpless initially thought that the whole nebula was just the area immediately surrounding HD 158618, and the rest of the nebula's size was only revealed later.

SIMBAD gives the wrong location for this object, confusing it for LBN 13. The error seems to come from the Lynds' Catalogue of Bright Nebulae itself.
