= Simeis 22 =

Planetary Nebula

Nebula
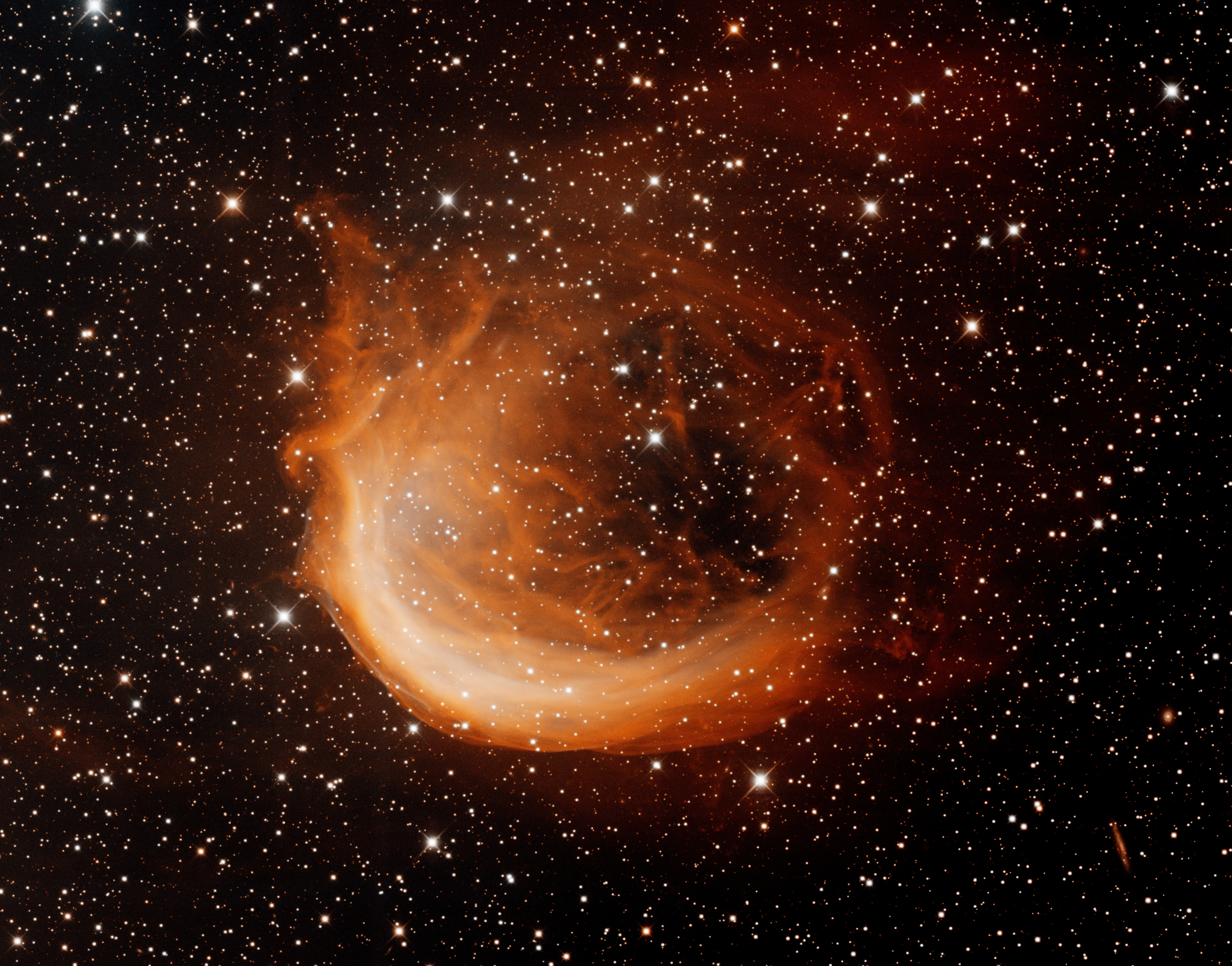

Observation data: J2000 epoch
- Right ascension: 1^{h} 30^{m} 16.84^{s}
- Declination: 58° 26′ 21.4″
- Distance: 715 ly
- Constellation: Cassiopeia
- Designations: PN G128.0-04.1, Sh 2-188

Simeis 22, also known as the Firefox Nebula, is a planetary nebula in Cassiopeia. It was discovered in the early 1950s by Grigory Shajn and Vera Gaze. It was independently discovered by Stewart Sharpless. It was first thought to be a supernova remnant, and was then thought to be a planetary nebula.

The nebula is brightest towards the southwest, since that is the direction the central star is moving. The nebula is a prominent example of interaction with the interstellar medium, as the gasses being pushed by the central star are also pushing against interstellar gasses, resulting in increased density and mass, which creates a bow shock. At the edges of the bow shock, whirlpool like structures have formed.
