= MWC 137 =

Star in the constellation Canis Major

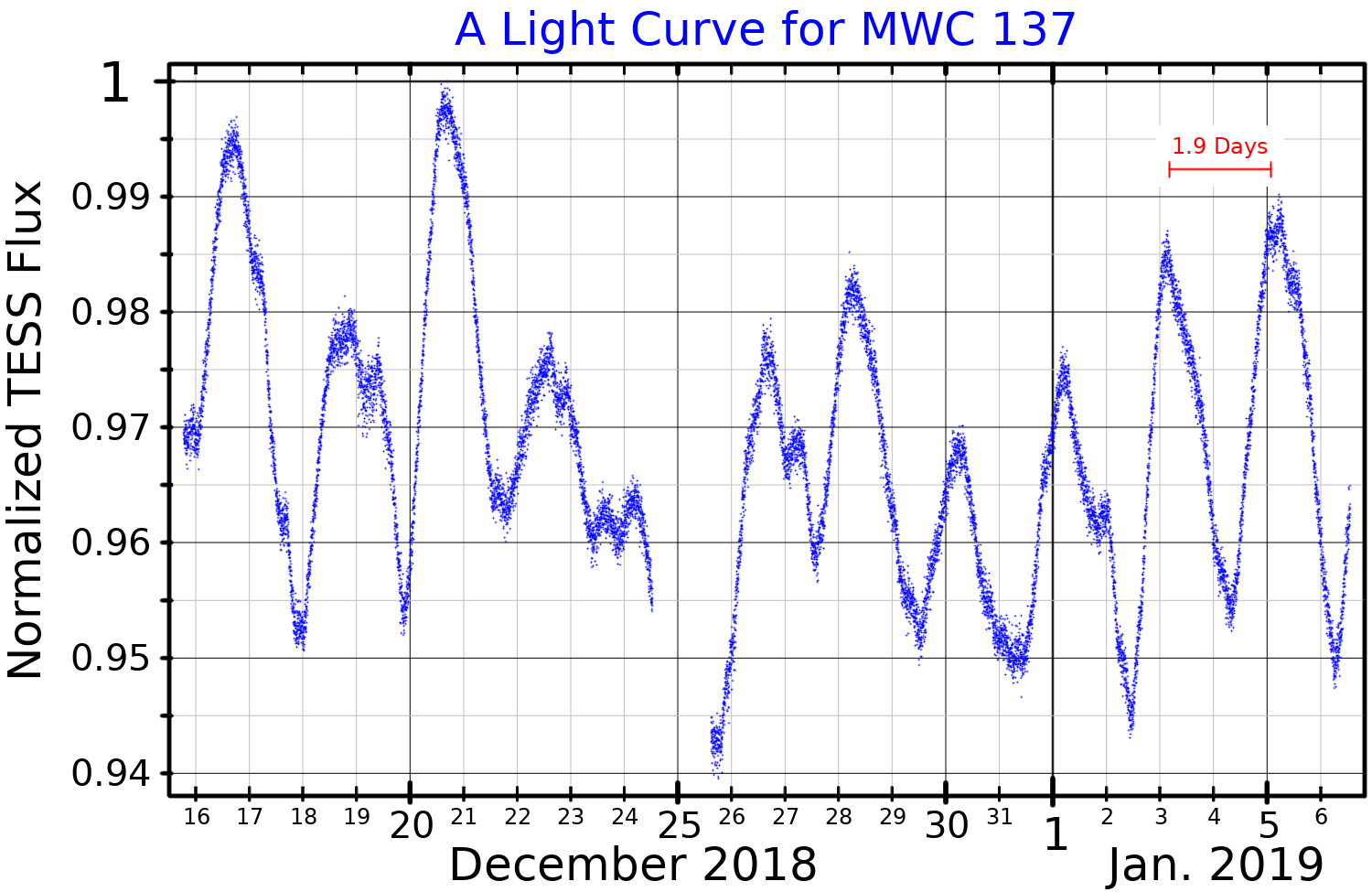
- A light curve for MWC 137, plotted from TESS data

Observation data Epoch J2000 Equinox J2000
- Constellation: Orion
- Right ascension: 06^{h} 18^{m} 45.522^{s}
- Declination: +15° 16′ 52.24″
- Apparent magnitude (V): 11.47 to 11.62

Characteristics
- Evolutionary stage: Supergiant
- Spectral type: sgB[e]
- B−V color index: 1.700±0.495
- Variable type: pulsating

Astrometry
| Radial velocity (R_{v}) | +652.92±0.02 km/s |
| Proper motion (μ) | RA: −0.294 mas/yr Dec.: −0.510 mas/yr |
| Parallax (π) | 0.194±0.0256 mas |
| Distance | 17,000±4,600 ly (5,200±1,400 pc) |
| Absolute magnitude (M_{V}) | −7.2 |

Details
| Mass | 37+9 −5 M_{☉} 30 to 70 M_{☉} |
| Radius | 26+29 −9 R_{☉} |
| Luminosity | 690,000 L_{☉} |
| Temperature | 28,200 K |
| Rotational velocity (v sin i) | 95.3 km/s |
| Age | 4.7±0.7 Myr |

Other designations
- V1308 Ori, HIP 29988, IRAS 06158+1517, 2MASS J06184553+1516522

Database references
| SIMBAD | data |

MWC 137 is a supergiant star in the equatorial constellation of Orion. It has the variable star designation V1308 Ori; MWC 137 is from the Mount Wilson Catalogue published in 1933. The star is located at a distance of about 17.0 ± 4.6 thousand light-years (5.2 ± 1.4 kpc), at the center of the filamentary nebula Sh 2-266.

== Properties ==
This is a massive B[e] star that displays radial pulsational variabilities with a dominant period of around 1.9 days. Evolutionary models show it to be near or in its post main sequence stage. The star displays a jet – a large, collaminated outflow, which suggests the presence of an accretion disk. An X-ray source detected by the SWIFT observatory may be associated with MWC 137, which suggests the presence of a neutron star companion.

MWC 137 has a stellar classification of sgB[e], where 'sg' indicates it is a supergiant-type B[e] star. The mass is uncertain, but lies in the range of 30 to 70 times the mass of the Sun. In 2021, M. Kraus and associates found a mass estimate of roughly 37 solar masses. It is radiating 690,000 times the luminosity of the Sun from its photosphere at an effective temperature of 28,200 K.

This star is located at the center of the filamentary nebula Sh 2-266, which is elliptical in shape and spans an angular size of 80′ × 56′. This has the form of a ring nebula, possibly as the result of stellar winds interacting with the interstellar medium or ejected matter. A bow-shaped feature was discovered in 2021, at a position angle of 225°–245° at an angular separation of 80″ from MWC 137. The star is directly associated with an H II region that spans an angular size of one arcminute.
