= Sh 2-24 =

Molecular cloud

Sharpless 2-24
Nebula

Observation data: J2000 epoch
- Right ascension: 16^{h} 11^{m} 06^{s}
- Declination: −7° 04′ 00″
- Distance: 50-240 pc
- Apparent dimensions (V): 65' x 45'
- Constellation: Ophiuchus
- Designations: MBM 57, IRAS 16083-0653, LBN 17

Sh 2-24 is a molecular cloud in the constellation Ophiuchus, near the border with Scorpius. It is part of the Sharpless catalog assembled by Stewart Sharpless. It is one of the closest molecular clouds, with its closest side being only 50 parsecs (~163 light years) away, and the furthest side being 240 parsecs (~783 light years) away.
