= SNR G65.3+5.7 =

Supernova remnant

Nebula
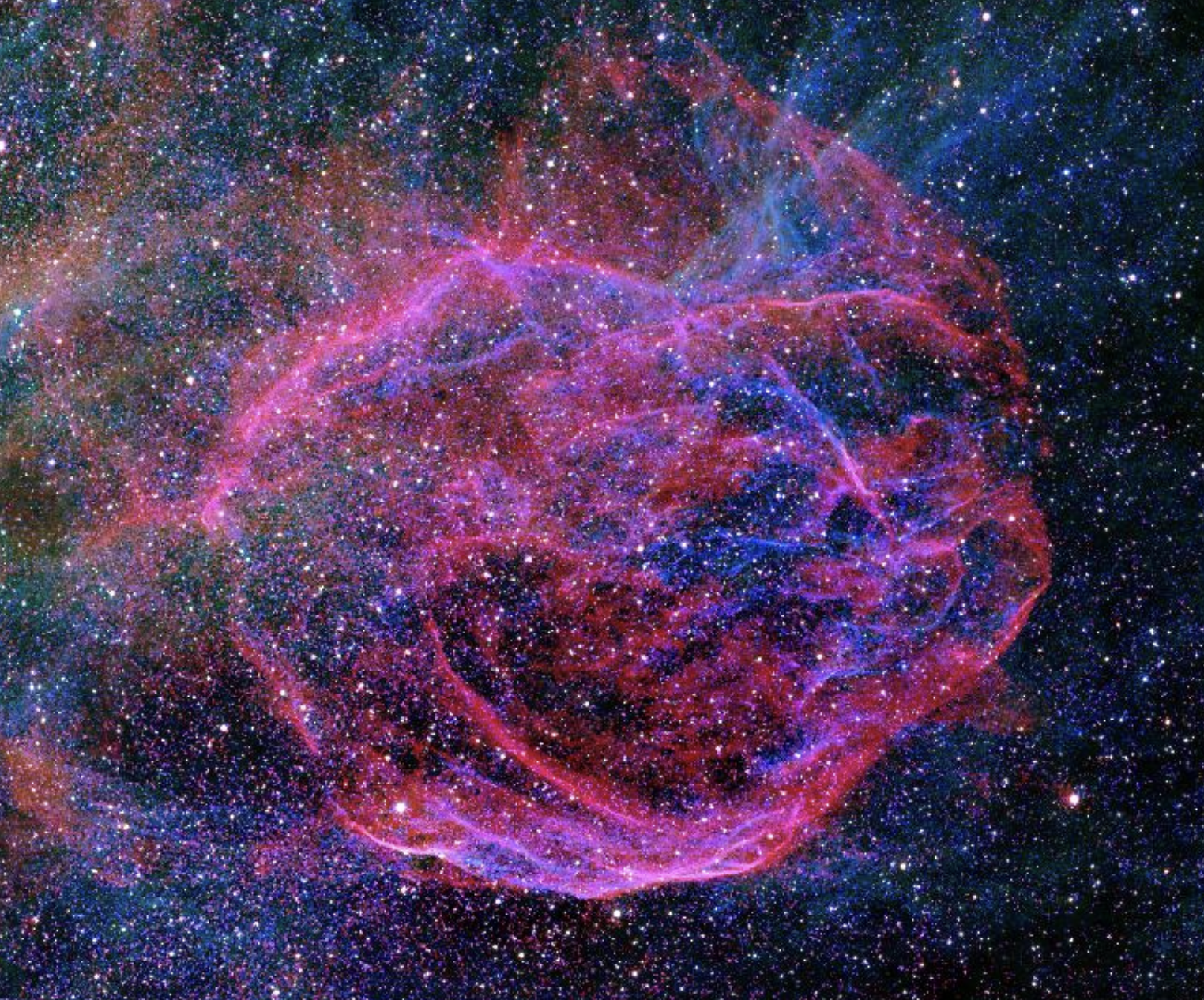
- SNR G65.3+5.7 imaged in 2025

Observation data
- Distance: 3,200 ly
- Apparent dimensions (V): 4° x 3.3°

Physical characteristics
- Radius: 115 ly
- Designations: Sh 2-92, Sh 2-94, Sh 2-96

SNR G65.3+5.7, also known as the Little Veil Nebula, is a supernova remnant in Cygnus. It is made up of multiple Sharpless Objects. Sh 2-92, Sh 2-94, and Sh 2-96.

The nebula was discovered in 1977 during an optical study on emission lines. Individual sections of the nebula were previously known, however no association between then was identified prior to the discovery of the nebula.

The origin supernova occurred about 27,500 years ago. The pulsar PSR J1931+30, which has a rotation period of 582 ms, is located in the nebula. The pulsar is 45' away from the current center of the remnant. It is not known if the pulsar is the central remnant object, or an otherwise unrelated object passing through the nebula. The nebula has almost entered a cooling phase. It is possible the nebula is expanding through a region of space already cleared of interstellar dust by a previous supernova.
