= Sh 2-140 =

Emission nebula in the constellation Cepheus

Nebula
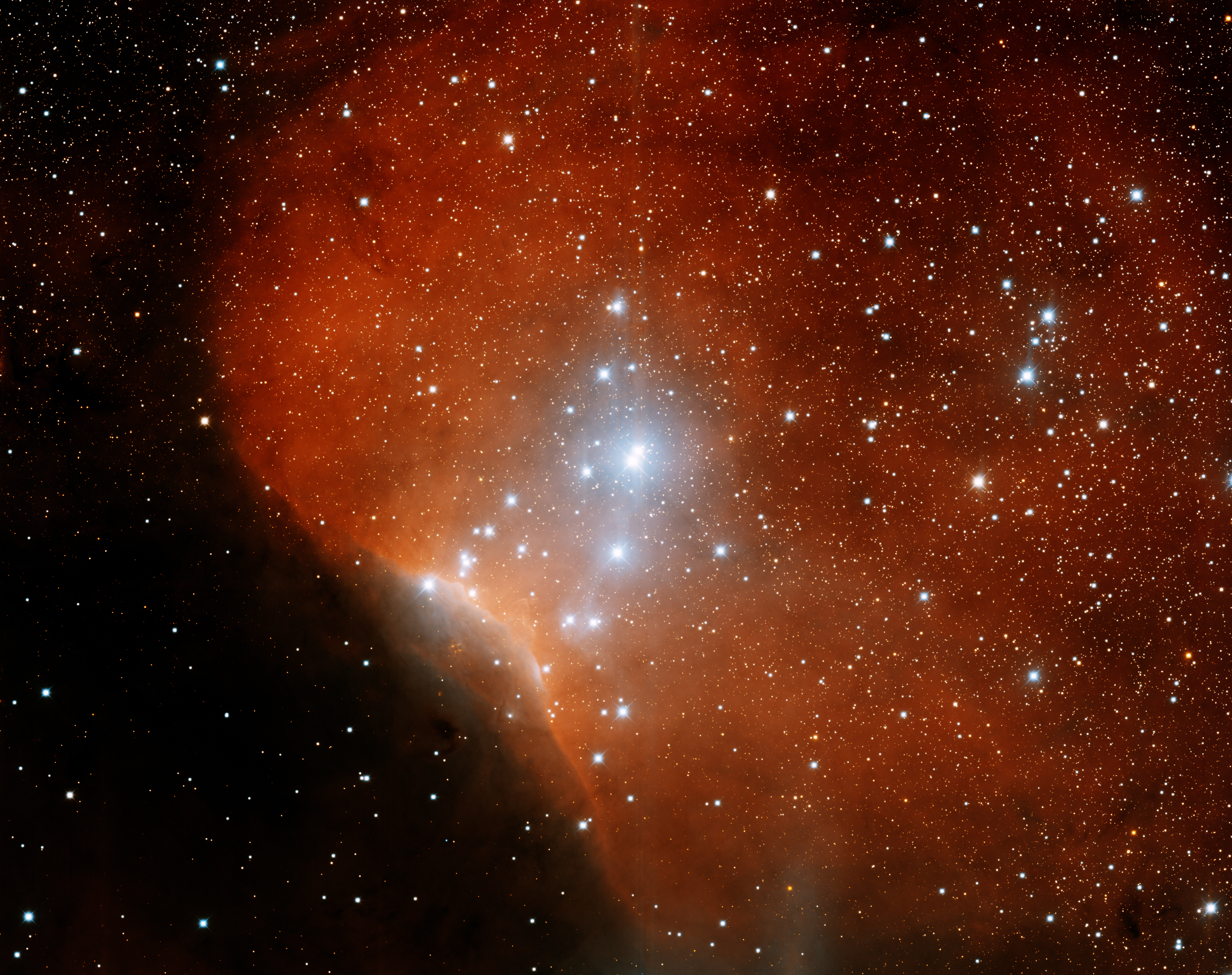
- Sh 2-140 as imaged by the Nicholas U. Mayall Telescope

Observation data: J2000.0 epoch
- Right ascension: 22 19 21.46
- Declination: 63° 14' 53.68"
- Distance: 3,000 ly (900 pc)
- Constellation: Cepheus

Sharpless 140 is an H II region and emission nebula in the constellation Cepheus, 3,000 light years from the Solar System. It is part of the Cepheus bubble. The surface of the nebula's clouds primarily consists of polycyclic aromatic hydrocarbons.

== See also ==
- Sharpless catalog
