= Sh 2-47 =

Molecular cloud

Sharpless 2-47
Nebula
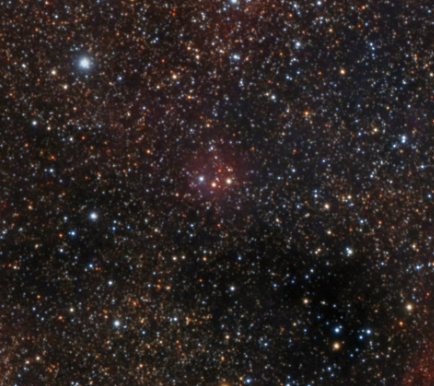

Observation data: J2000 epoch
- Right ascension: 18^{h} 17^{m} 34^{s}
- Declination: −15° 38′ 20″
- Distance: 10,100 ly (3100 pc)
- Apparent magnitude (V): 15.73
- Constellation: Serpens

Physical characteristics
- Radius: 15 ly

Sh 2-47 is a nebula in Serpens. It is probably ionized by the star [L85] S47 3. It is located between Messier 17 and Sh 2-44.
