= Sh 2-71 =

Planetary nebula

Sharpless 2-71
Nebula
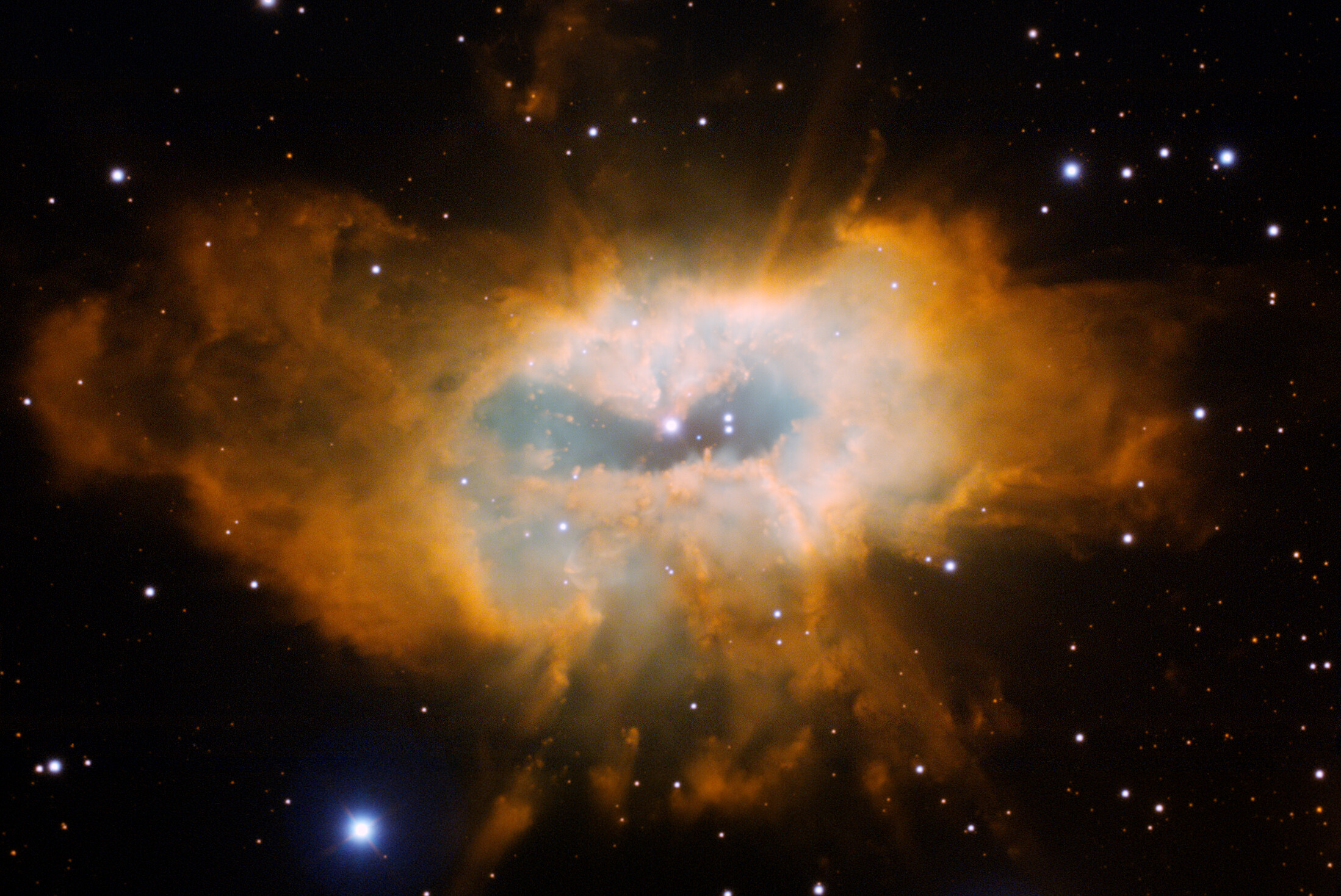
- Image of Sh 2-71 Nebula, as seen by the Gemini Observatory

Observation data: epoch
- Right ascension: 19h 01m 59s
- Declination: +02° 09' 23"
- Distance: 1050 pc
- Constellation: Aquila

Physical characteristics
- Absolute magnitude (V): 12.3
- Dimensions: 2.5' x 1.3'
- Designations: LBN 103, PN G035.9-01.1 , Sh 2-71, Min 1-90, V-V 1-9

Sh 2-71 is a planetary nebula in the constellation of Aquila. It is notable for its highly irregular and complex morphology, which has been attributed to interactions within a binary star system. However, it is believed the shape and structure of the nebula is formed partially because of a triple star system that has since ejected its third member. The nebula exhibits a broad, asymmetrical ring structure with bipolar lobes and extended emission regions, challenging traditional models of planetary nebula formation driven by single or binary stars. Sh 2-71 is a benchmark object for studying the influence of multiple-star dynamics on the late stages of stellar evolution.

== Discovery ==
It was discovered by Rudolph Minkowski in 1946. It was cataloged by Stewart Sharpless in 1959, who thought it was a possible planetary nebula. In 1961, it was confirmed as a planetary nebula by Boris Vorontsov-Velyaminov.

== Morphology ==
A 2022 morpho-kinematic study using the SHAPE software modeled its 3D structure from Gemini GMOS images, the HASH Planetary Nebula Database, DSS plates, and high-resolution long-slit spectra from the San Pedro Mártir Kinematic Catalogue.
