= Sh 2-115 =

Sharpless 2-115
Nebula
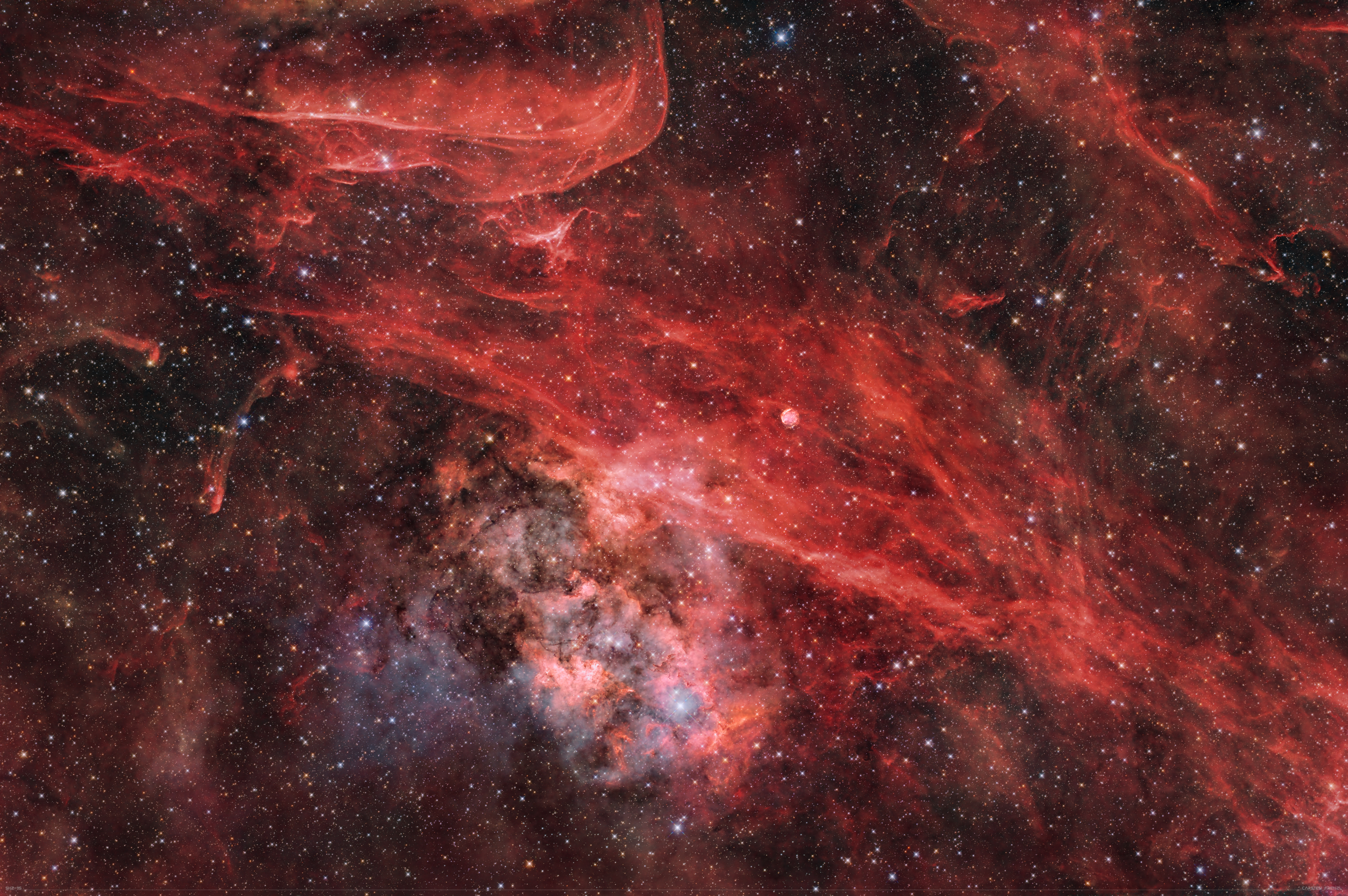
- Image of Sh 2-115 Nebula

Observation data: epoch
- Right ascension: 20^{h} 35^{m} 2.00^{s}
- Declination: +47° 02′ 24.0″
- Distance: 3000 ± 600 pc
- Constellation: Cygnus
- Designations: Sh 2-115, LBN 357, 3C 416.1

Sh 2-115 is an emission nebula and H II region in the constellation of Cygnus, catalogued by Stewart Sharpless in his 1959 second edition of H II regions visible from the northern hemisphere. It lies approximately 2–2.5° northwest of the bright star Deneb (α Cygni) and is part of the extensive star-forming complexes in the Orion Arm of the Milky Way.

The primary source ionizing the nebula is the open cluster named Berkeley 90 located in the eastern part of the nebula, and the star responsible for ionization is O-type star LS III +46 12 (O4.5IV(f)). Three other stars named DM 46 2972 (O9.5 V), DM 46 2978 (B0III) and LS III 46 12 (O6) are also suspected to be involved in the ionization.
