= Barnard 92 =

Dark nebula with misleading name

Nebula
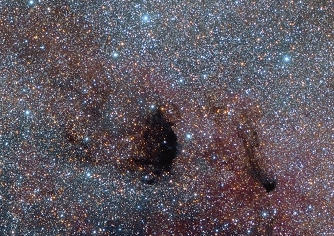
- Barnard 92 in front of background stars

Observation data: J2000 epoch
- Right ascension: 18^{h} 15.5^{m}
- Declination: −18° 13′
- Apparent diameter: 12.0′ × 12.0′

Barnard 92 (abbreviated to B92) is a dark nebula located in the Small Sagittarius Star Cloud. It was discovered by American astronomer Edward Emerson Barnard. It is a component of the larger nebula Sh 2-41.

B92 was initially referred to as "the black hole," given its appearance, after it was first catalogued in 1913. It was later discovered to be a dark nebula, and the title is now misleading, as the name black hole is used in modern astrophysics to describe a region of spacetime in which gravity is too strong for light to escape.
