= Sh 2-58 =

Emission nebula in Scutum

Sharpless 2-58
Nebula

Observation data: epoch
- Right ascension: 18^{h} 31^{m} 24.00^{s}
- Declination: −08° 28′ 0.0″
- Distance: 8,060 ly (2472 pc)
- Constellation: Scutum
- Designations: Sh 2-58, LBN 79

Sh 2-58 (also known as LBN 79) is an emission nebula visible in the constellation of Scutum.

Located in the western part of the constellation, about 1° SW of the star Alpha Scuti, it extends for 8 arc minutes in the direction of a region of the Milky Way heavily obscured by dense dust clouds. The best time to observe it in the evening sky is between June and November, being only 9° from the celestial equator, it can be seen from all populated regions of the Earth.

== Characteristics ==
It is a remote H II region located on the inner edge of the Sagittarius Arm at a distance of about 8,060 light-years (2470 parsecs), about 300 parsecs from the Sagittarius OB4 association. This nebula would be associated with the molecular cloud SYCSW 317, identified through its emissions at the wavelength of CO, and the radio wave source [L89b] 23.115+0.556, coinciding with a compact H II region. Further evidence of active star formation comes from the presence of the infrared radiation source RAFGL 5246S.

The area of sky in which Sh 2-58 is located includes the nearby cloud Sh 2-57, from which it is apparently separated by the dark nebula LDN 446, and the large superbubble known as the Scutum supershell. However, the distances of the individual objects are different from each other and therefore there is no physical relationship between them: Sh 2-57 is located at 1,500 parsecs from the solar system, therefore very much in the foreground, while the superbubble is part of the Scutum-Crux Arm, being at a distance of about 3,400 parsecs. Even more distant is the supernova remnant W41.
