= Sh 2-114 =

Emission nebula in Cygnus constellation

Sharpless 2-114
Nebula
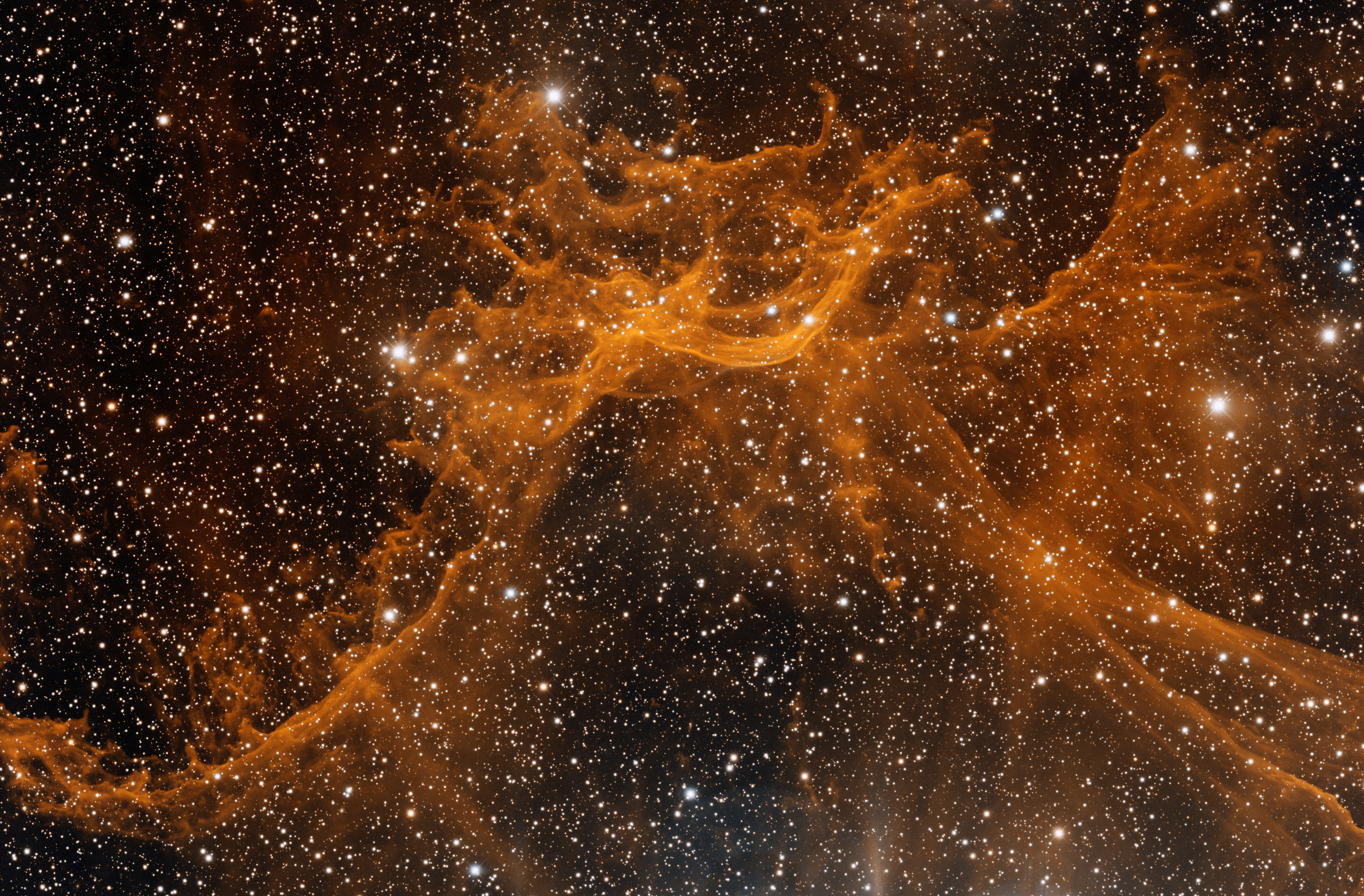
- Image of Sh 2-114 Nebula

Observation data: epoch
- Right ascension: 21^{h} 21^{m} 12.00^{s}
- Declination: +38° 42′ 0.0″
- Distance: 1180 ± 100 pc
- Constellation: Cygnus
- Designations: Sh 2-114, LBN 347

Sh 2-114 (also known as Flying Dragon Nebula) is a faint emission nebula located in the constellation of Cygnus. It lies roughly 4° East-Northeast of star Sigma Cygni.

At the northeastern edge is a small bipolar planetary nebula Kronberger 26 (also known as Lan 384), discovered in 2006 and confirmed as a true planetary nebula in 2011. Kn 26 appears as a faint butterfly-shaped object in deep images and is unrelated to Sh 2-114 except by line-of-sight projection.
