= Sh 2-106 =

Emission nebula in the constellation Cygnus

Emission nebula
- H II region
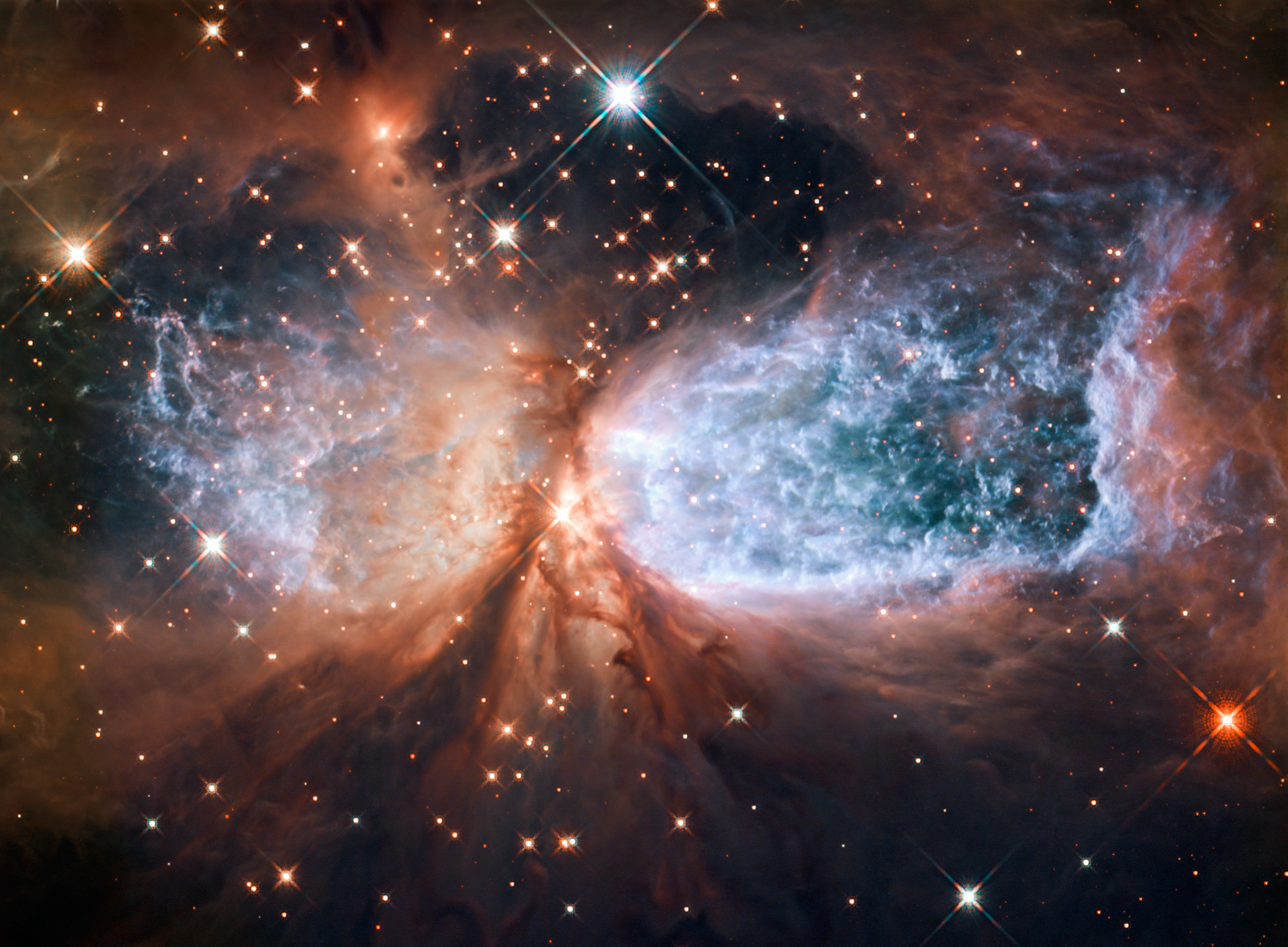
- Sharpless 2-106

Observation data: J2000.0 epoch
- Subtype: bipolar nebula
- Right ascension: 20^{h} 27^{m} 27.1^{s}
- Declination: +37° 22′ 39″
- Distance: 2,000 ly (600 pc)
- Apparent dimensions (V): 3′ × 3′
- Constellation: Cygnus
- Designations: S106

Sh 2-106, also known as the Celestial Snow Angel, is an emission nebula and a star formation region in the constellation Cygnus. It is a H II region estimated to be around 2,000 light years (600 pc) from Earth, in an isolated area of the Milky Way.

In the center of the nebula is a young and massive star that emits jets of hot gas from its poles, forming the bipolar structure. Dust that surrounds the star is also ionized by it. The nebula spans about 2 light-years across.

== Central star ==
The central star, a source of infrared radiation usually referred to as S106 IR or S106 IRS 4. It is a massive star, approximately 15 solar masses. Two jets of matter streaming from its poles heat surrounding matter to a temperature of around 10,000 °C. Dust that is not ionized by the star's jets reflect light from the star. With an estimated surface temperature of 37,000 K, it is classified as a type O8 star. It loses around 10^{−6} $\begin{smallmatrix}M_\odot\end{smallmatrix}$ per year in solar winds, ejecting material at around 100 km/s.

Studies of images has revealed that the star-forming region has also created hundreds of low-mass brown dwarf stars and protostars.
