= Sh 2-10 =

Nebula

Emission nebula

Observation data: epoch
- Right ascension: 17h 19m
- Declination: -34d 5m
- Distance: 3261 ly (1000 pc)
- Apparent magnitude (V): 17.69
- Apparent dimensions (V): 60' x 60'
- Constellation: Scorpius
- Designations: RCW 130

Sh 2-10, also called RCW 130, is an emission nebula in the constellation Scorpius. For unknown reasons, it is a significant source of radio emissions.
