= NGC 6857 =

Molecular cloud

Nebula
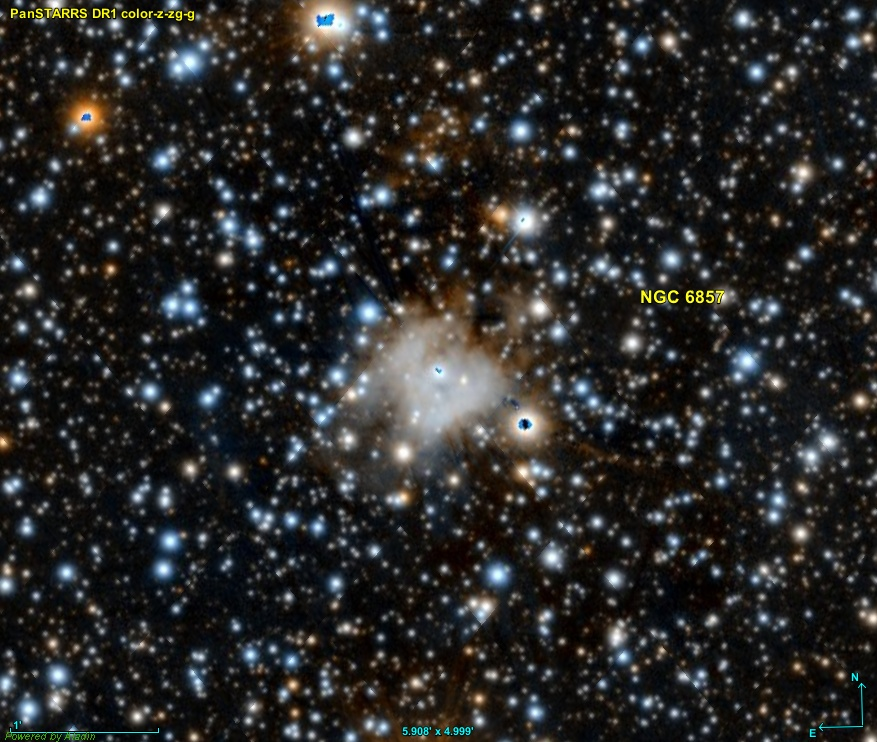

Observation data: J2000 epoch
- Right ascension: 20^{h} 01^{m} 53^{s}
- Declination: +33° 29′ 26″
- Distance: 6700 pc
- Apparent magnitude (V): 11.4
- Apparent dimensions (V): 0.63' x 0.63'
- Constellation: Cygnus
- Designations: GC 4536, h 2062, Sh 2-99, Sh 2-100, PGC 3517682

NGC 6857 is an emission nebula and star-forming region located in the constellation Cygnus. It is located in the Perseus Arm of the Milky Way galaxy.

It was discovered by William Herschel on 6 September 1784. It was later observed by John Herschel, who believed it to be a star cluster. He described it as "A small bunch of very minute Milky Way stars, so small as almost to look nebulous; north preceding is another." Rudolph Minkowski would conclude in 1946 that NGC 6857 was a nebula.

The nebula is divided into two parts. The two parts are designated at Sh 2-99 and Sh 2-100. It visually resembles a planetary nebula.

Despite not being a galaxy, a PGC number was assigned to it by HyperLEDA.
