= Sh 2-201 =

Emission nebula in the constellation Cassiopeia

Emission nebula
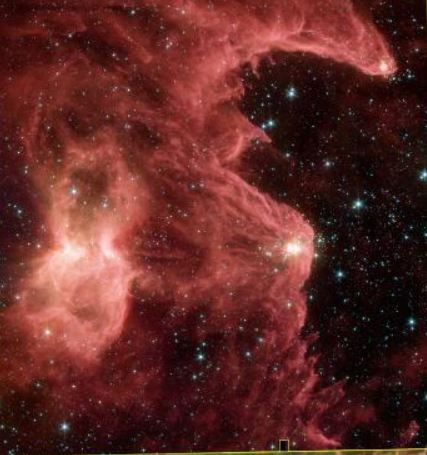
- Sh 2-201

Observation data: epoch
- Right ascension: 2h 59m
- Declination: 60d 16m
- Distance: 9980 ly (3060 pc)
- Apparent dimensions (V): 5' x 5'
- Constellation: Cassiopeia

Sh 2-201 is an emission nebula in the constellation Cassiopeia. It is in the eastern part of the constellation along the eastern border of the IC 1848. The nebula is 9980 light-years away from Earth. It is also seen close to Sh 2-199. It is ionized by infrared cluster [BDB2003] G138.50+01.64.
