= Sh 2-38 =

Emission nebula

Sharpless 2-38
Emission nebula
- H II region

Observation data: epoch
- Right ascension: 18^{h} 08^{m} 51^{s}
- Declination: −18° 15′ 36″
- Distance: 7170 ly (2400 pc)
- Apparent magnitude (V): 10.26
- Apparent dimensions (V): 3' x 3'
- Constellation: Sagittarius
- Designations: [CPA2006] N4, LBN 48, RAFGL 2074, vdB 114

Sh 2-38 is a nebula in the constellation Sagittarius. It appears in the shape of a bubble.
