= Sh 2-129 =

Emission nebula in the constellation Cepheus

Sharpless 2-129
Emission nebula
- H II region
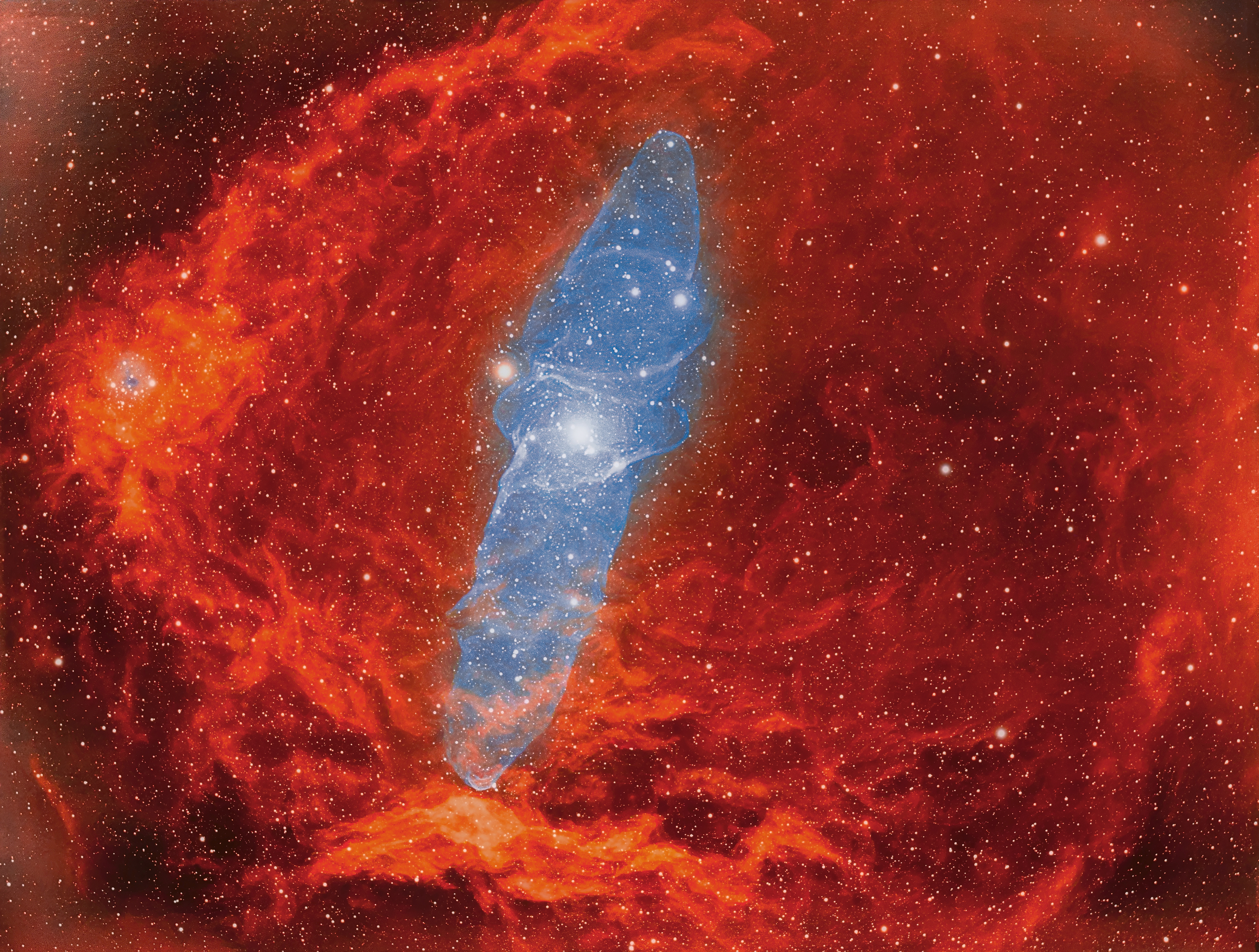
- Image of Sh 2-129 Nebula

Observation data: epoch
- Right ascension: 21^{h} 11^{m} 48.00^{s}
- Declination: +59° 56′ 60.0″
- Distance: 520 ± 100 pc
- Constellation: Cepheus
- Designations: Sh 2-129, LBN 428

Sh 2-129 (also known as the Flying Bat Nebula) is a large emission nebula and H II region located in the constellation Cepheus. It is part of the Cepheus molecular cloud complex and belongs to the Cep OB2 association. Reflection nebula vdB 140 can be seen near Sh 2-129.

Within Sh 2-129 lies a bipolar outflow nebula named Ou 4 (also known as Squid Nebula). The central star of Ou4 is believed to be the massive triple star system named HD 202214 (O9.5IV).

Wide-field of Sh 2-129 imaged by Alpha Zhang
