= Sh 2-33 =

Molecular Cloud

Sharpless 2-33
Nebula

Observation data: epoch
- Right ascension: 15^{h} 59^{m} 54^{s}
- Declination: −01° 36′ 00″
- Distance: 360 ly (110 pc)
- Apparent magnitude (V): 15.32
- Apparent dimensions (V): 30' x 20'
- Constellation: Serpens

Physical characteristics
- Radius: 3.7 ly
- Designations: CB 68, LBN 36, MBM 38

Sh 2-33 is a molecular cloud in Serpens. It has also been described as a dark globule. It is very faint and has very little color, and must be observed in very dark skies. The cloud contains 33 stars, and has faint magnetic activity. It is composed mostly of carbon and oxygen.
