= Sh 2-113 =

Planetary nebula in the constellation Cygnus

Flying Dragon Nebula
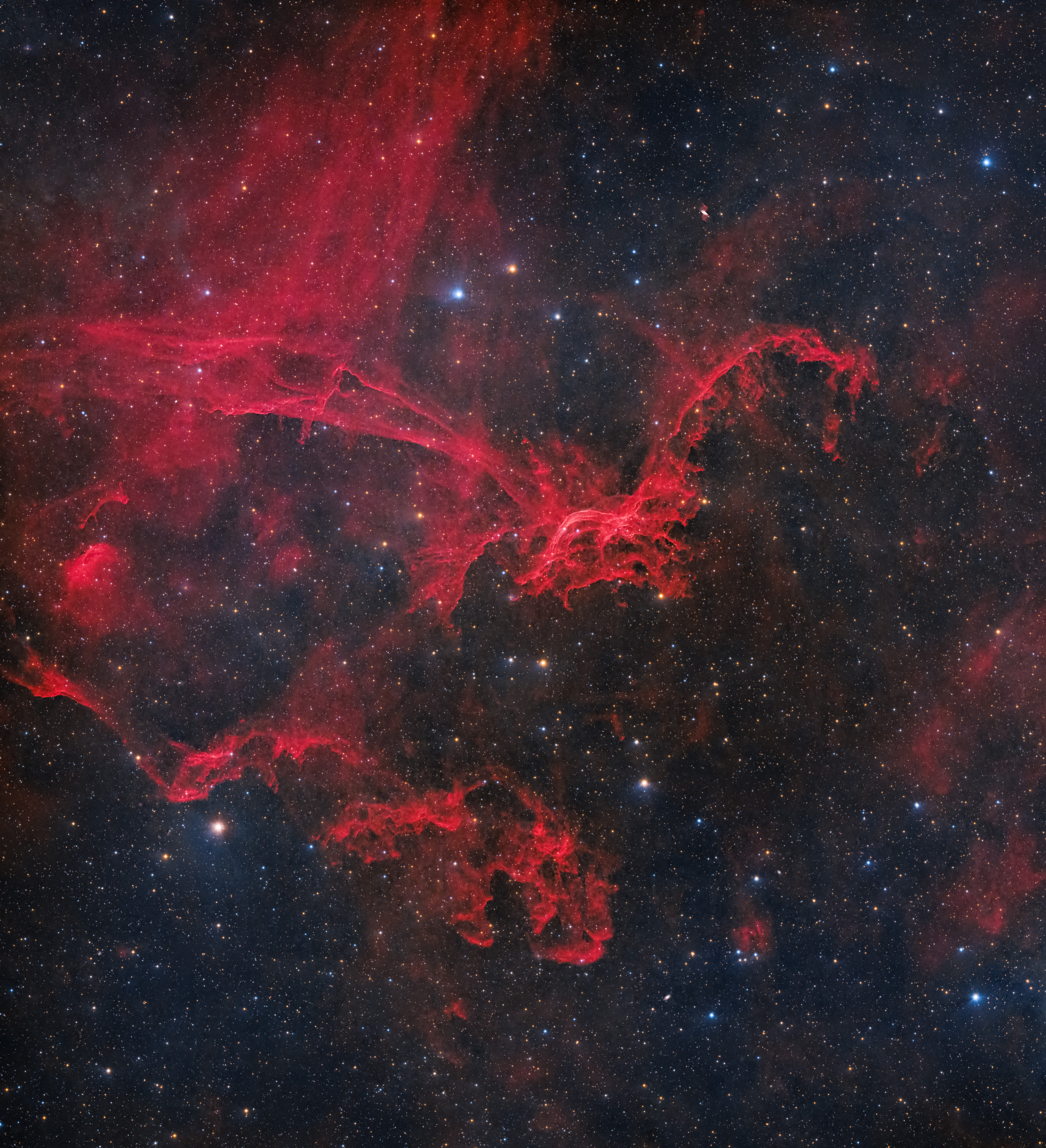
- Flying Dragon Nebula in narrowband by amateur astronomer Chuck Ayoub

Observation data
- Distance: 12,400

Physical characteristics
- Radius: 27 light years across
- Estimated age: A few thousand years old

Associations
- Constellation: Cygnus

Sh 2-113 (Sharpless 113) also known as the Flying Dragon Nebula or LBN 333, is a nebula that resembles a supernova remnant (SNR) but with no evidence to support it being an SNR. Sh 2-113 is located in the northern hemisphere constellation of Cygnus south of the star Deneb. Nearby are the planetary nebulae K 2-81, Kn 26 and LBN 346.
