= Sh 2-68 =

Planetary nebula

Sharpless 2-68
Nebula
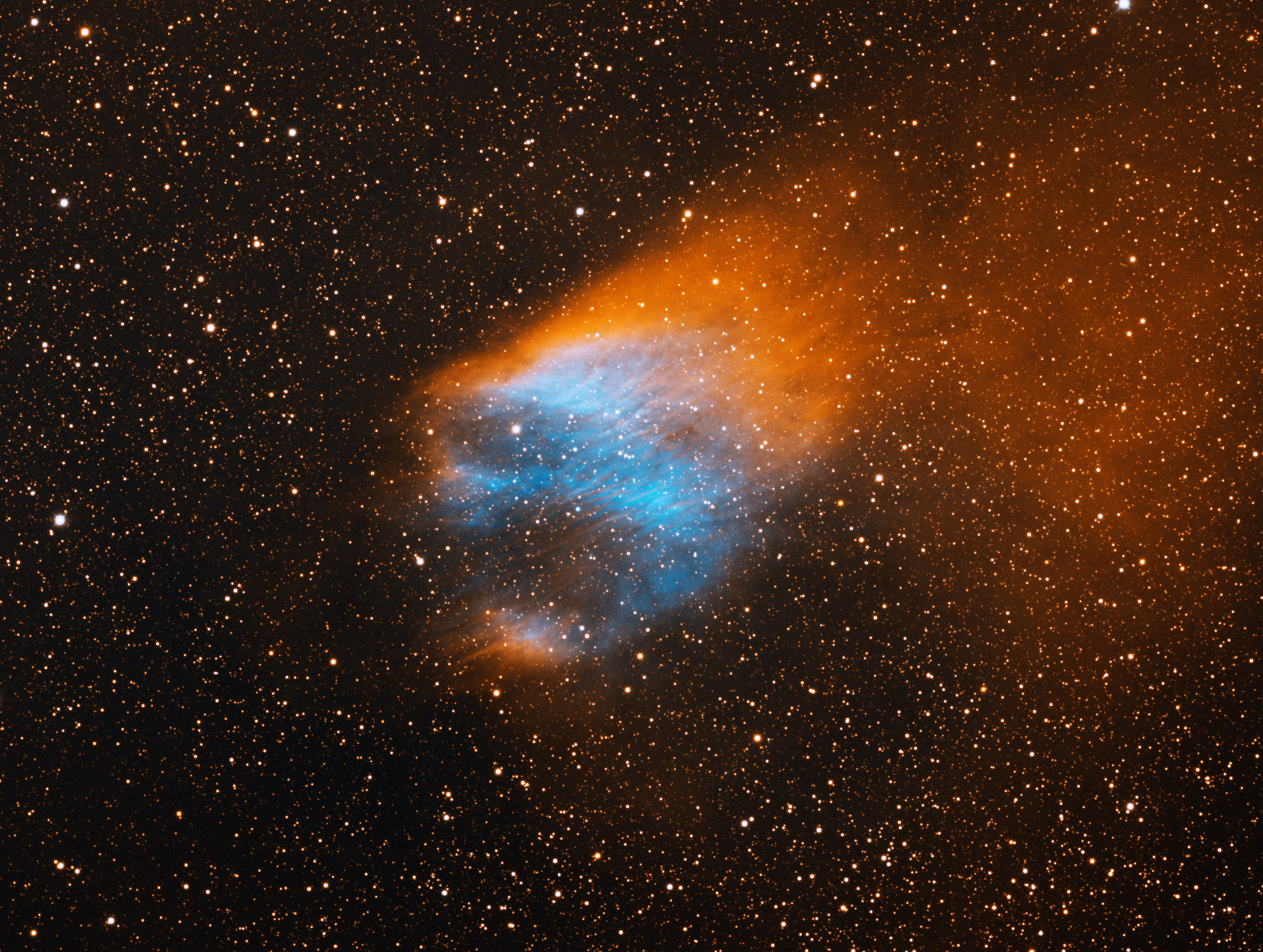
- Image of Sh 2-68 Nebula

Observation data: epoch
- Right ascension: 18^{h} 24^{m} 58.43^{s}
- Declination: +00° 51′ 36.0″
- Distance: 350 pc
- Constellation: Serpens

Physical characteristics
- Dimensions: 8'
- Designations: Sh 2-68, LBN 93, PN G030.6+06.2

Sh 2-68 (also known as Flaming Skull Nebula) is a planetary nebula located in the constellation Serpens. It is the remnant of a low to intermediate mass star that has shed its outer layers, leaving behind a glowing shell of ionized gas illuminated by its central white dwarf star. Estimated to be 30,000 to 45,000 years old, Sh 2-68 is notable for its interaction with the surrounding interstellar medium (ISM), which has stalled the nebula's expansion and created an extended tail structure, giving it a distinctive asymmetrical appearance.

It has a proper motion of 53.2 +/- 5.5 mas yr-1, the largest value for a planetary nebula ever found.

== Central star ==
The central star of Sh 2-68 is a hot white dwarf designated WD 1822+008 with a spectral type DAOZ.6, indicating strong absorption lines from hydrogen and helium in a hot atmosphere. The star appears as a blue point source offset from the nebula's center, embedded in the oxygen-rich core.
