= Sh 2-36 =

Molecular cloud

Sharpless 2-36
Nebula

Observation data: J2000 epoch
- Right ascension: 16^{h} 05^{m} 36^{s}
- Declination: 00° 23′ 00″
- Distance: 360 ly (110 pc)
- Apparent magnitude (V): 16.58
- Apparent dimensions (V): 45' x 45'
- Constellation: Serpens

Physical characteristics
- Radius: 4.7 ly
- Designations: LBN 45, MBM 39

Sh 2-36 is a molecular cloud in Serpens. It is very faint and requires very dark skies to become visible.
