= Sh 2-126 =

Emission nebula in Lacerta constellation

Sharpless 2-126
Nebula
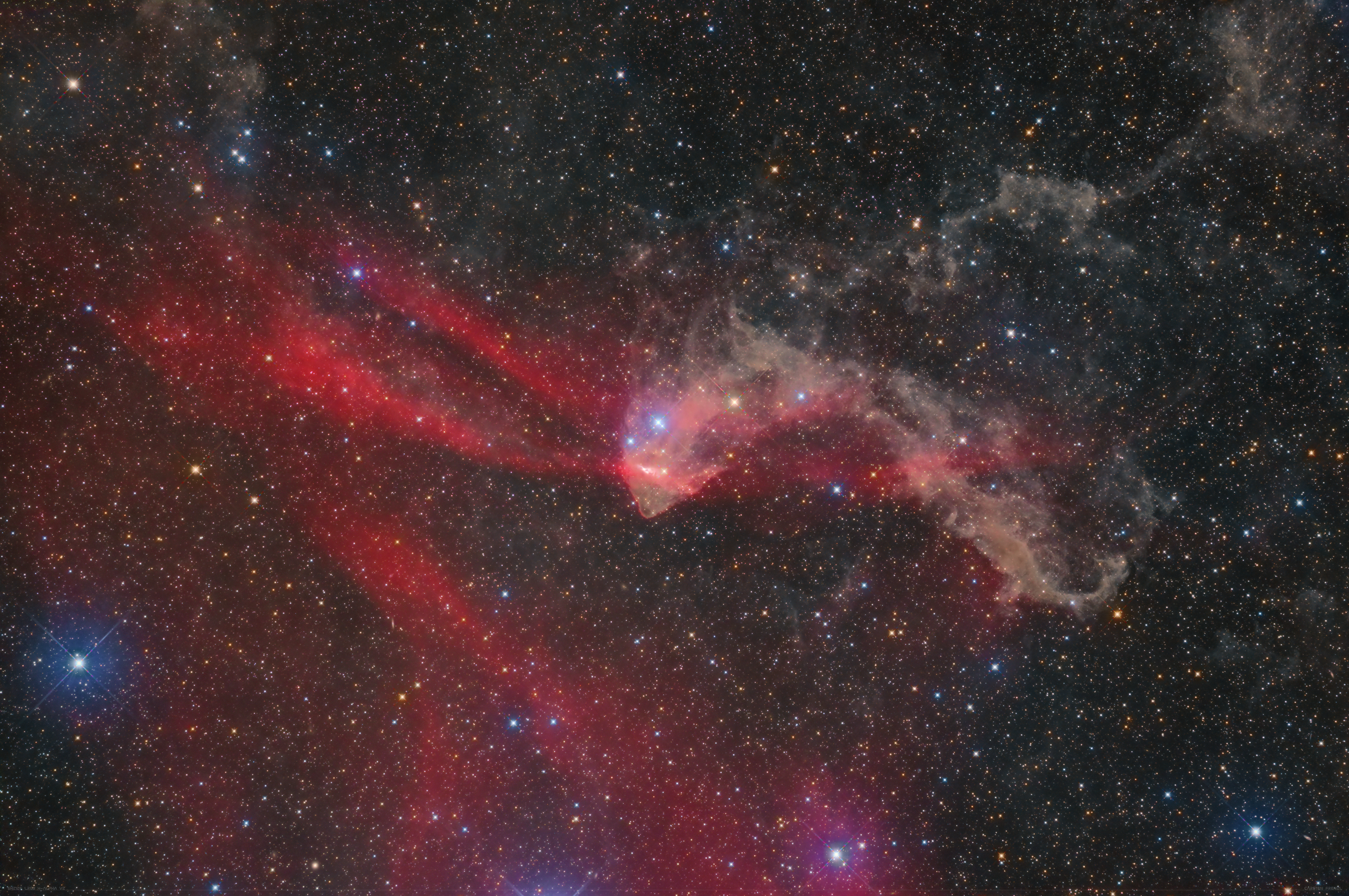
- Image of Sh 2-126 Nebula

Observation data: epoch
- Right ascension: 22^{h} 34^{m} 37.90^{s}
- Declination: +40° 39′ 60.0″
- Distance: 1,200 ly
- Constellation: Lacerta
- Designations: Sh 2-126, LBN 428

Sh 2-126 (also known as Great Lacerta Nebula or Star Funnel Nebula) is a large emission nebula and molecular cloud complex located approximately 1200 light-years away in the constellation Lacerta. It is a prominent member of the Lacerta OB1 association.

The primary source of ionization is the bright O-type star 10 Lacertae (O9V), a member of the Lacerta OB1 association. Additional ultraviolet radiation comes from other massive stars in the association, as well as from the embedded Herbig Ae/Be star V375 Lacertae (A7Ve).

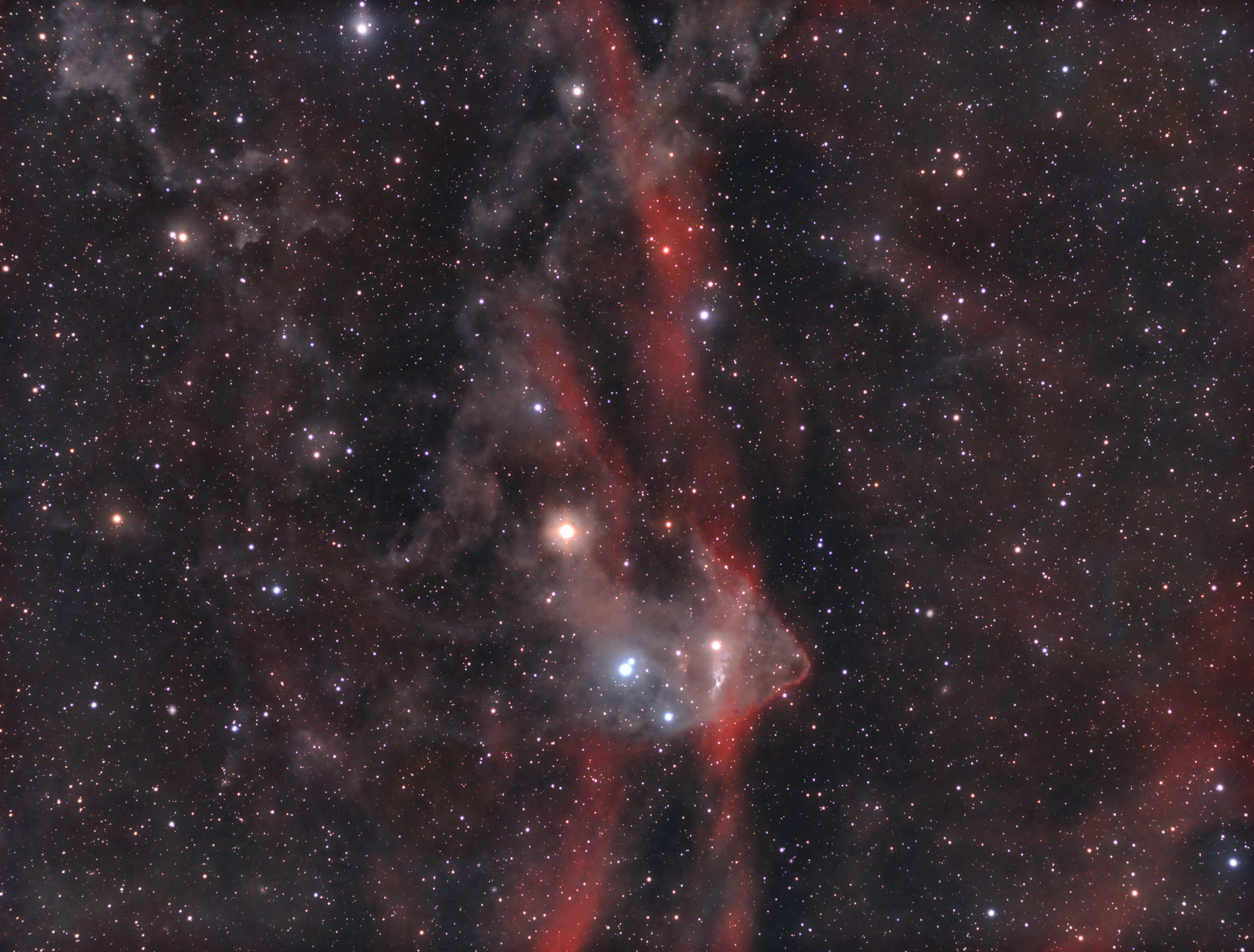
LBN 437 by K. Zeppetello
