= Sh 2-112 =

Nebula

Emission nebula
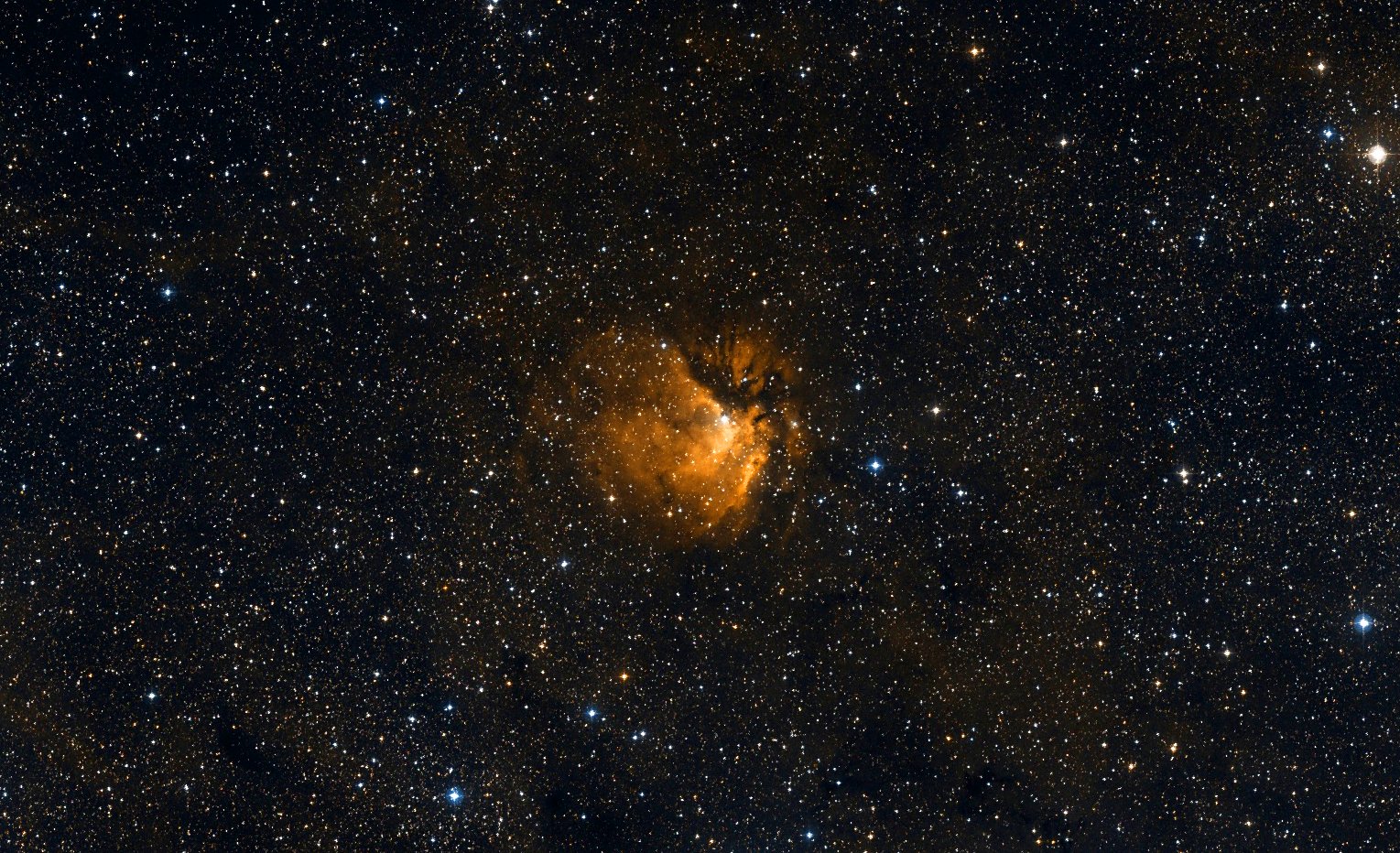

Observation data: J2000 epoch
- Right ascension: 20h 33m 49s
- Declination: 45d 38m
- Distance: 5600 ly (1740 pc)
- Apparent magnitude (V): 13.8
- Apparent dimensions (V): 15' x 15'
- Constellation: Cygnus

Physical characteristics
- Radius: 25 ly
- Designations: DWB 174, LBN 337

Sh 2-112 is a nebula in Cygnus. It is located within the Orion Arm, and is near star complex Cygnus X. It is ionized by the central star BD+45 3216. It is a region of star-formation, with 138 Young Stellar Objects candidates within the nebula. The average age of these objects is about one million years. it contains a large dust band on its western side.
