= IC 1470 =

Nebula

Nebula
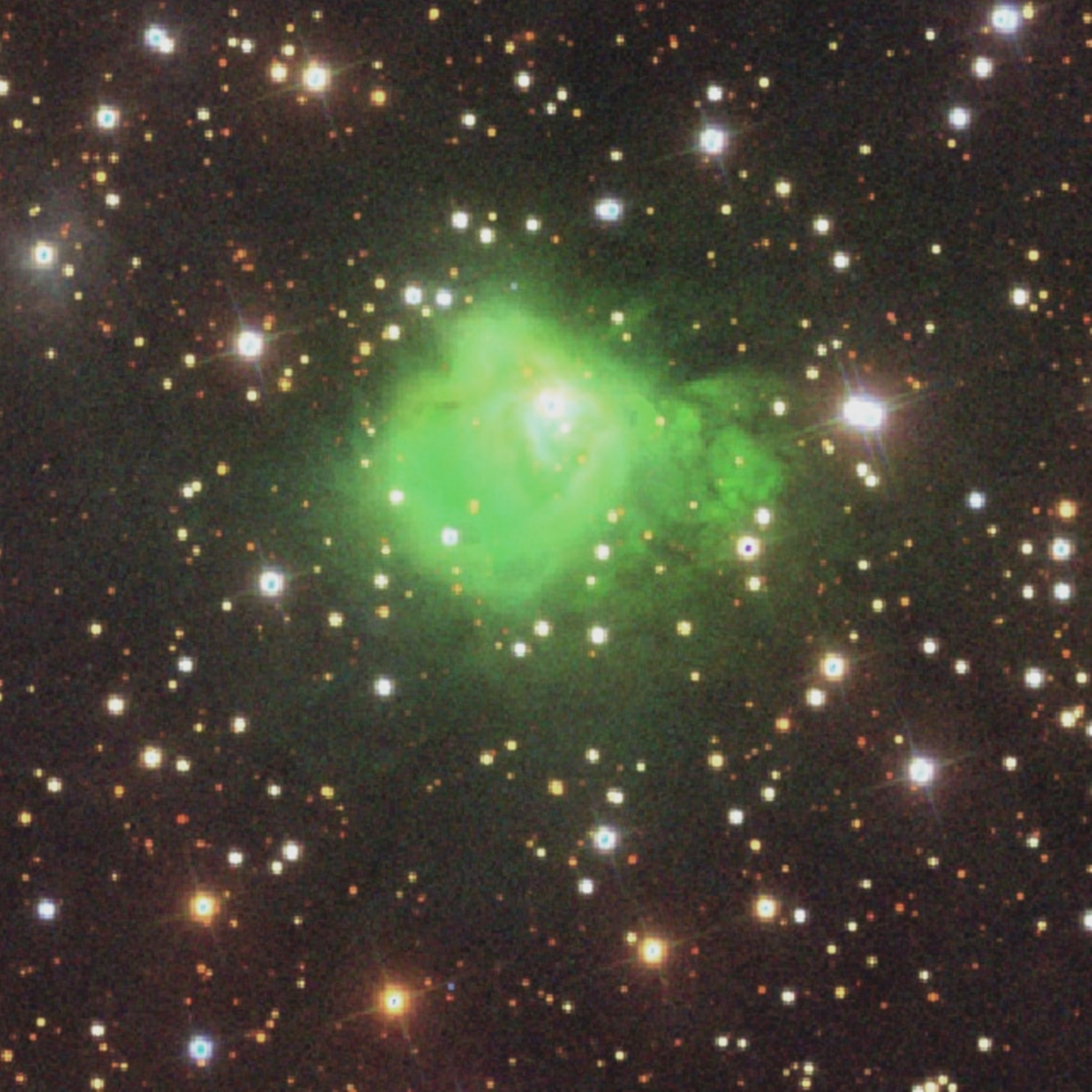

Observation data: epoch
- Right ascension: 23^{h} 05^{m} 10.4^{s}
- Declination: +60° 14′ 32″
- Distance: 15,900 ly (4890 pc)
- Apparent magnitude (V): 8.1
- Constellation: Cepheus

Physical characteristics
- Dimensions: 24' x 30'
- Designations: Avedisova 1336, CED 208, Sh 2-156

IC 1470 is a nebula in Cepheus. It was first discovered by Rudolf Ferdinand Spitaler on 20 March, 1892. The following night it was independently discovered by Carl Frederick Pechüle and Edward Emerson Barnard.

The star cluster [BDS2003] 39 is contained within, however only one central star causes ionization. The nebula has an estimated age of three million years. It is located in the Perseus Arm. It is associated with the nearby open cluster NGC 7510.
