= Sh 2-43 =

Emission nebula

Sharpless 2-43
Nebula

Observation data: epoch
- Right ascension: 18^{h} 16^{m} 24.00^{s}
- Declination: −17° 30′ 60.0″
- Distance: 5,200 ly (1,600 pc)
- Constellation: Sagittarius
- Designations: Sh 2-43, RCW 156

Sh 2-43 also known as RCW 156, is an emission nebula located in the constellation of Sagittarius. It is a faint, diffuse region of ionized hydrogen gas, potentially representing a localized concentration within a broader area of interstellar emission. It lies in a relatively empty patch of sky, bordered by several OB associations including Sgr OB1, Sgr OB7, and Sct OB3.

== Charecterstics ==
The nebula includes a slightly brighter core region designated as RCW 156a and is associated with the star forming region SFR 13.62-0.76, which encompasses infrared sources, molecular clouds, and the radio H II region [CH87] 013.839-0.763. It is also spatially aligned with the suspected supernova remnant GAL 013.1-00.5.

Nearby bright star HD 167720, a K2 III giant star is visible near the nebula, though it is not responsible for ionizing the nebula.
