= Abell 31 =

Planetary nebula in the Cancer constellation

Emission nebula
- Planetary nebula
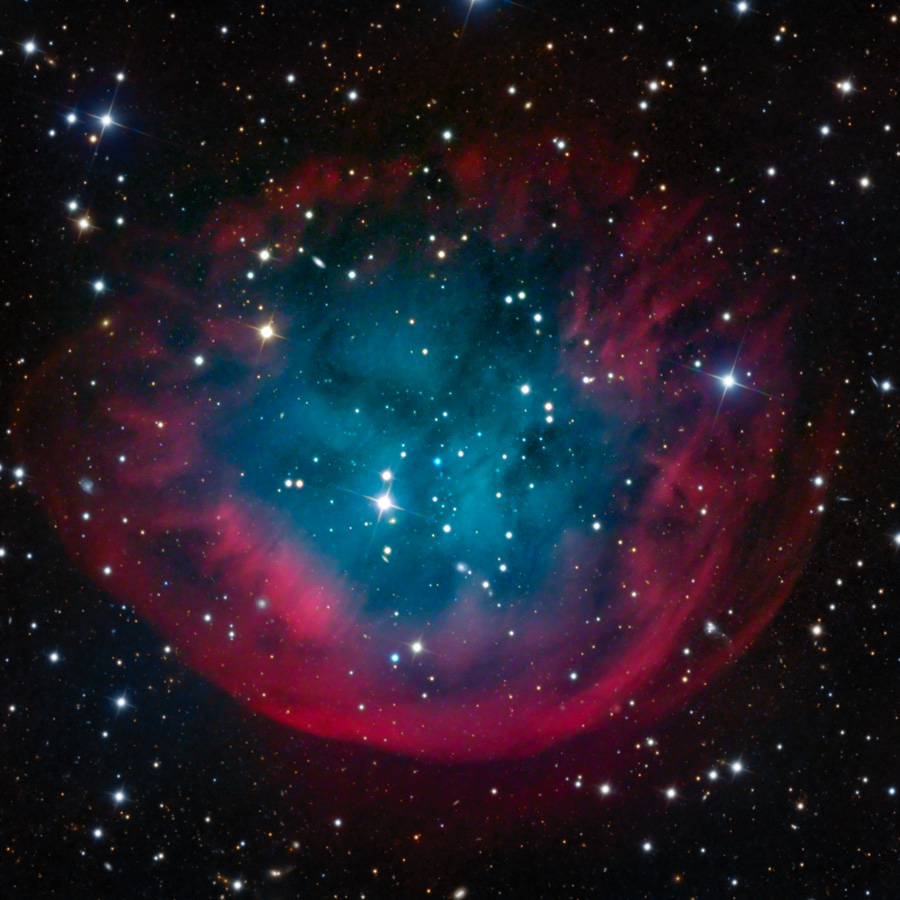
- Abell 31 as seen from the Mount Lemmon Observatory

Observation data: J2000 epoch
- Right ascension: 08^{h} 54^{m} 11.4^{s}
- Declination: +08° 54′ 30″
- Apparent magnitude (V): 15.5
- Apparent dimensions (V): 16.2′
- Constellation: Cancer

Physical characteristics
- Radius: 10 ly
- Notable features: A very large and colorful PN
- Designations: Sh2-290, PK 219.1+31.2, A 31, ARO 135

Abell 31 (also known as Sh2-290 or PK 219+31.1) is an ancient planetary nebula in the constellation of Cancer. It is estimated to be about 2,000 light years away. The central white dwarf has a spectral type of DAO.

Abell 31 is mainly composed of hydrogen and oxygen gas. The blue oxygen occupies the central region and makes up the bulk of the nebula, while the red hydrogen makes a ring at the nebula's edge. This object is very old, and consequently, it is very large and dim (specifically, it has a low surface brightness), and its gas is dispersing into the interstellar medium.

Some astronomical objects that appear nearby from our perspective include star clusters Messier 44 and 67, and galaxies NGC 2731 and IC 523, among many others.
