= Sh 2-87 =

Nebula

Nebula
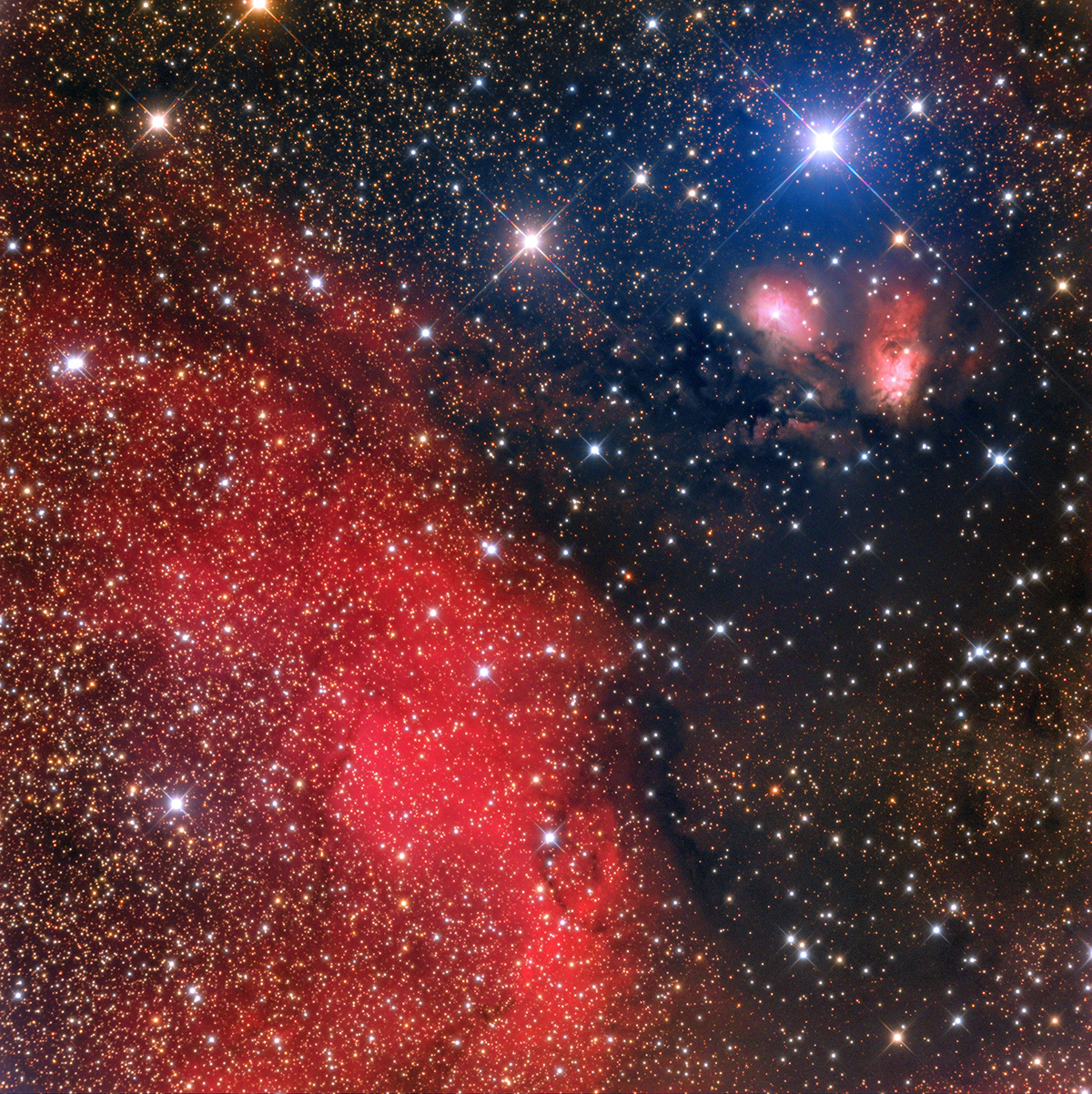
- Sh 2-87 is the larger nebula to the left, Sh 2-88 is the smaller one to the upper right

Observation data: epoch
- Right ascension: 19°46'20"
- Declination: +24 35 15
- Distance: 7,500 ly
- Apparent dimensions (V): 10'
- Constellation: Vulpecula
- Designations: LBN 136

Sh 2-87 is a star-forming nebula with a mass of about 7000 suns. It is close to Sh 2-88, and is located in the central part of the constellation Vulpecula, about 3° northeast of the famous Dumbbell Nebula (M27).
