= Sh 2-31 =

Emission nebula

Sharpless 2-31
Emission nebula
- H II region
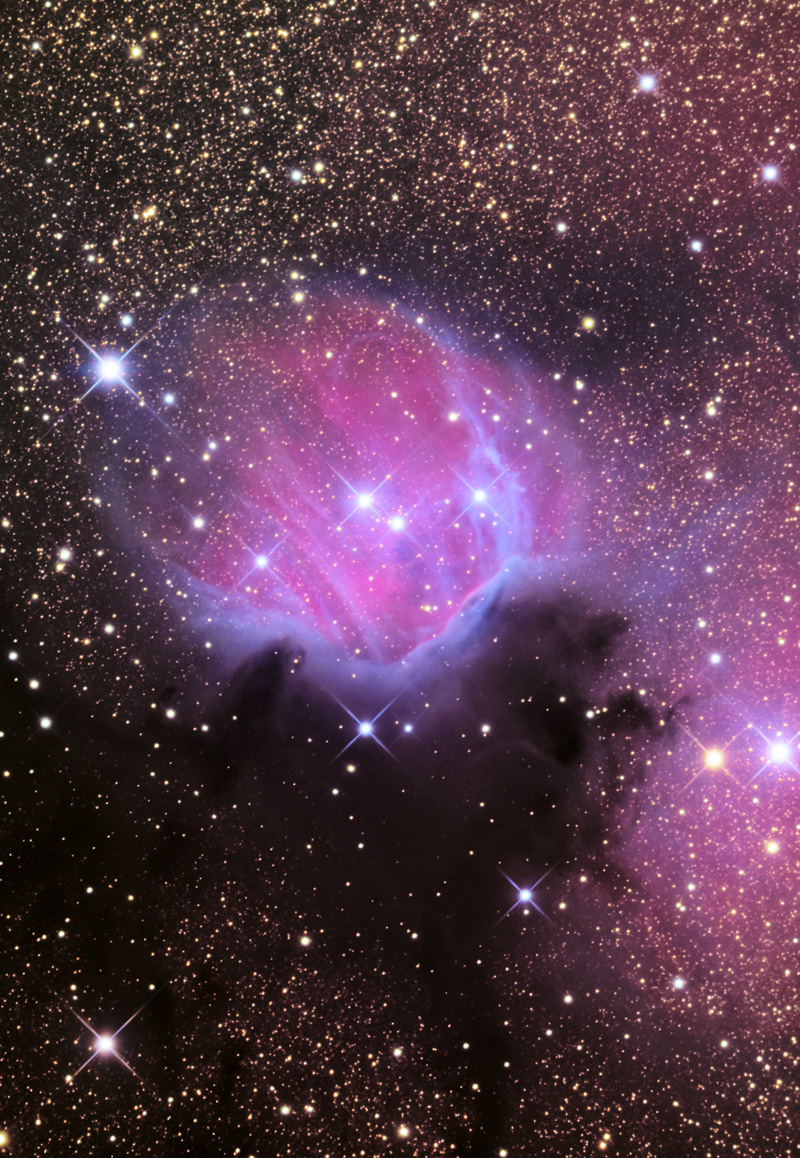
- Sh 2-31 (lower right) and Sh 2-32 (center)

Observation data: J2000 epoch
- Right ascension: 18^{h} 09^{m} 42^{s}
- Declination: −23° 59′ 17″
- Distance: 4570 ly (1500 pc)
- Apparent magnitude (V): 10.96
- Apparent dimensions (V): 1.63° x 1.12°
- Constellation: Sagittarius

Physical characteristics
- Radius: 11 ly
- Designations: CED 154b, Gum 75, h 1996, IC 1274, LBN 33

Sh 2-31, also known by the designation IC 1274, is an emission nebula in the constellation Sagittarius. It is ionized by the stars HD 165921 and HD 166107. Sh 2-31 is located very close to the Lagoon Nebula.

== Discovery ==
Sh 2-31 was discovered, along with nearby Sh 2-29, by John Herschel on 1st July 1826. He listed it as 'h 1996'. In 1833, he re-discovered it, this time labeling it as 'h 3733'. The distinction between the various nebulae of the region would not be established until 1892, when Edward Emerson Barnard photographed that region of the sky.
