= Sh 2-46 =

H II region

Sharpless 2-46
Nebula
- Image of Sh 2-46 Nebula

Observation data: epoch
- Right ascension: 18^{h} 06^{m} 6.00^{s}
- Declination: −14° 08′ 60.0″
- Distance: 6,000 ly (2,000 pc)
- Constellation: Serpens
- Designations: Sh 2-46, RCW 158, Gum 80, LBN 58

Sh 2-46 (also known as RCW 158), is an H II region, a glowing cloud of ionized hydrogen gas—located in the southern constellation of Serpens. Situated approximately 6,000 light-years from Earth, the nebula is notable for its red emission caused by the ionization of hydrogen atoms, energized by the central runaway star HD 165319 (O9.7Ib). It is an isolated nebula positioned above the galactic plane and contains polycyclic aromatic hydrocarbons (PAHs). It is located about 3° west of the Eagle Nebula (Messier 16) and is part of broader star-forming activity in the region.

== Central star ==
The primary ionizing source for Sh 2-46 is the massive O-type supergiant star HD 165319, classified as O9.7Ib. This luminous blue star is a runaway star, believed to have originated in the nearby Eagle Nebula (NGC 6611) but was ejected due to gravitational interactions about 1.8 million years ago. As it travels through Sh 2–46 at high speed, it creates a dynamic environment, including the observed bow shock.
