= Sh 2-44 =

Emission nebula

Sharpless 2-44
Emission nebula
- H II region
- As viewed by the ESO in 2023

Observation data: epoch
- Right ascension: 18^{h} 17^{m} 00^{s}
- Declination: −16° 49′ 08″
- Distance: 3650 pc
- Apparent dimensions (V): 60' x 40'
- Constellation: Sagittarius
- Designations: IC 4701, Gum 79, RCW 157, NRL 18, LBN 56

Sh 2-44 is a nebula in Sagittarius. It is also known by the designation IC 4701. It is located in the Sagittarius arm of the milky way. NGC 6596 is an open cluster that is in the direction of Sh 2-44, however is an unrelated foreground object. It is located about three degrees away from the much more famous nebula Messier 17. Reflection nebula vdB 120 is contained within Sh 2-44, reflecting the light from the star HD 167746.

It is a large star-forming region, and is ionized by the many new stars it has formed.

== Discovery ==
Sh 2-44 was discovered in August 1905 by Edward Emerson Barnard. It was initially thought to be connected with Messier 24, which is located to the north.
