= NGC 6559 =

Star-forming region in the constellation Sagittarius

Nebula
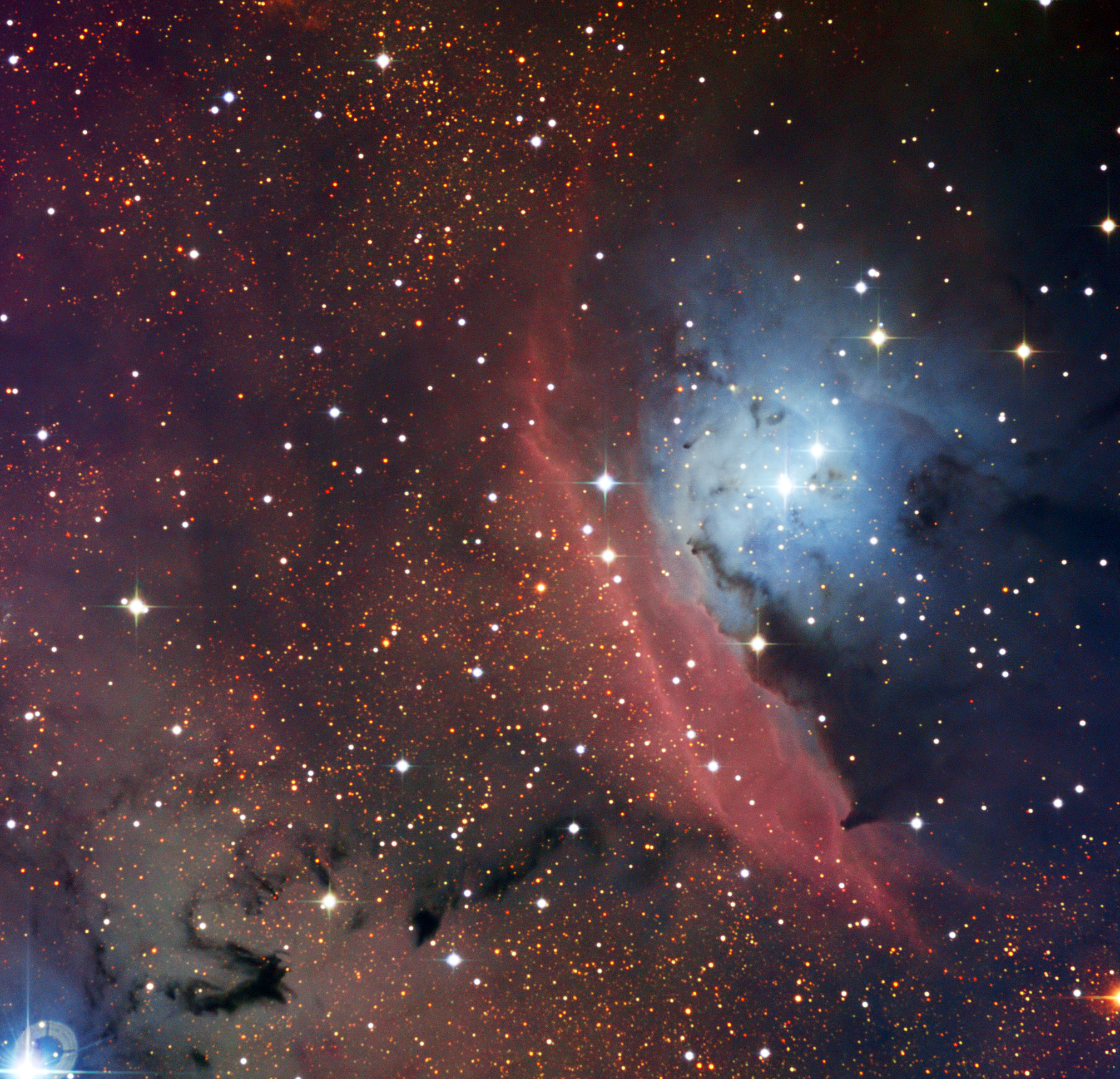
- NGC 6559 taken by the Danish 1.54-metre telescope located at ESO’s La Silla Observatory.

Observation data: J2000 epoch
- Right ascension: 18^{h} 09^{m} 56.8^{s}
- Declination: −24° 06′ 23″
- Constellation: Sagittarius
- Designations: ESO 521-40, LBN 28, LBN 007.03-02.26

NGC 6559 is a star-forming region located at a distance of about 5000 light-years from Earth, in the constellation of Sagittarius, showing both emission (red) and reflection (bluish) regions. NGC 6559 is relatively small at only a few lightyears across. The nebula is found within Sharpless 29, an irregular H II region.
