= Stewart Sharpless =

American astronomer (1926–2013)

Stewart Lane Sharpless
- Born: March 29, 1926; Milwaukee, Wisconsin
- Died: January 19, 2013 (aged 86); Rochester, New York
- Occupation: Astronomer

Stewart Sharpless (March 29, 1926 – January 19, 2013) was an American astronomer who carried out fundamental work on the structure of the Milky Way galaxy.

As a graduate student at Yerkes Observatory he worked under William Morgan with fellow graduate student Don Osterbrock. He helped Harold Johnson and Morgan with calculations used to help define the UBV photometric system. In 1952, Sharpless and Osterbrock published their observations that demonstrated the spiral structure of the Milky Way by estimating the distances to H II regions and young hot stars. For a while Sharpless was at Mount Wilson Observatory where he worked on galaxy photography with Walter Baade and Edwin Hubble.

In 1953 Sharpless joined the staff of the United States Naval Observatory Flagstaff Station. Here he surveyed and cataloged H II regions of the Milky Way Galaxy using the images from the Palomar Sky Survey. From this work Sharpless published his catalog of H II regions in two editions, the first in 1953 with 142 nebula. The second and final edition was published in 1959 with 313 nebulae (see Sharpless catalog).

Stewart Sharpless was before his death a retired professor emeritus in the Department of Physics and Astronomy at the University of Rochester.
