= List of infrared clusters =

This is a list of infrared clusters. An infrared cluster is a type of star cluster only visible in infrared light.

== Table ==
Cluster identifier	Image	Epoch J2000		Constellation	Distance (Light-years)	Age (Myr)	Diameter	Notes
Cluster identifier	Image	R. A.	Dec.	Constellation	Distance (Light-years)	Age (Myr)	Diameter	Notes
Quintuplet Cluster		17h 46m 13.9s	−28° 49′ 48″	Sagittarius	26,000	4.8 Million	50"	
Arches Cluster		17h 45m 50.5s	–28° 49′ 28″	Sagittarius	25,000	2.5 Million		
Young Stellar Cluster of RCW 38		08h 59m 05.52s	−47° 30′ 39.2″	Vela	5,500			
DBS2003 118		17h 19m 48.5s	−39° 20′ 19″	Scorpius	8,800			
DB2000 56		17h 46m 37.2s	−29° 22′ 02″	Sagittarius	5,055			Located behind the unrelated open cluster Collinder 347
DB2000 58		17h 46m 12s	−28° 51′ 0″	Sagittarius	4,890			
DB2000 5		17h 47m 08s	−28° 46′ 30″	Sagittarius	4890			One of two located in Sh 2-20
DB2000 6		17h 47m 08s	−28° 46′ 30″	Sagittarius	4890			One of two located in Sh 2-20

== See also ==
- List of open clusters
- Lists of astronomical objects
- List of globular clusters
- Lists of clusters
