= Elephant trunk (astronomy) =

Type of interstellar matter formation in molecular clouds

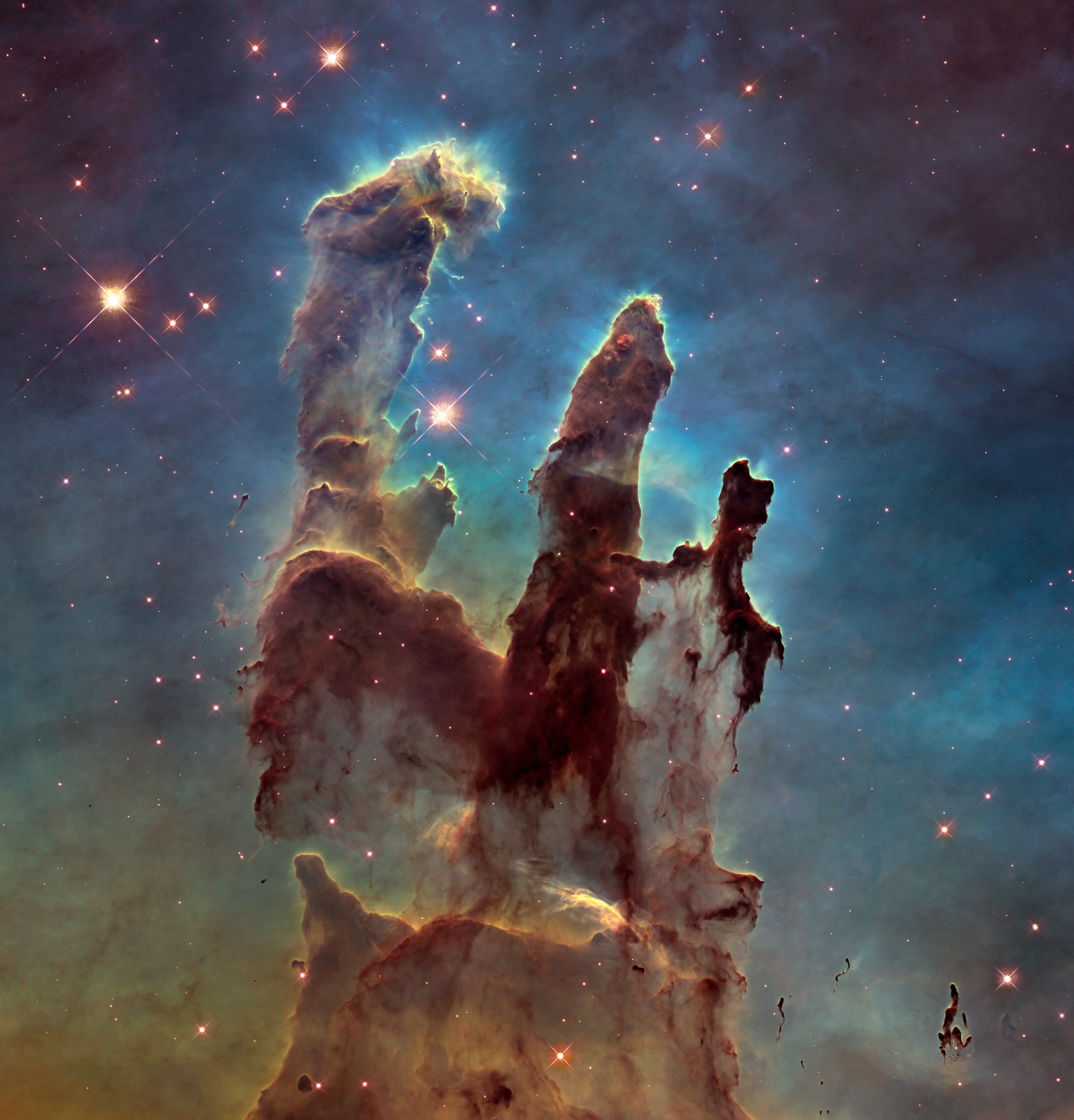
The "Pillars of Creation" in the Eagle Nebula.

Elephant trunks (more formally, cold molecular pillars) are a type of interstellar matter formations found in molecular clouds. They are located in the neighborhood of massive O type and B type stars, which, through their intense radiation, can create expanding regions of ionized gas known as H II regions. Elephant trunks resemble massive pillars or columns of gas and dust, but they come in various shapes, lengths, and colors. Astronomers study elephant trunks because of their unique formation process and use 2-D and 3-D simulations to try to understand how this phenomenon occurs.

== Formation ==
O type and B type stars are a classification of stars that strongly emit ultraviolet (UV) radiation. The UV radiation causes the surrounding cloud of hydrogen gas to ionize, forming H II regions. The gas does not ionize evenly throughout the cloud, therefore there are clumps of denser gas scattered throughout the cloud. These dense clumps are called evaporating gaseous globules (EGGs), and they are the starting point for the formation of an elephant trunk. The pillar shape is formed when the EGGs act as shields for the gases that lie behind them from the stellar winds. Stellar winds are a continuous flow of gas that is ejected from the stars and causes the lighter and less dense gas to erode away. The EGGs and the column of gas "downwind" from them are the basic formations of an elephant trunk.

== Structure ==
Elephant trunks form on the outer wall of the H II region cloud. At visible light wavelengths, astronomers can only study the structure of the surface of the trunks because the opacity of the gas obscures the internal core. The length of the columns is measured in light-years. Astronomers can calculate the densities and temperatures of the EGGs and the trunks by using infrared, millimeter, and radio observations. They have determined that elephant trunks have cold cores (20 K) surrounded by warm gas (60 K) with an outer hot shell (250-320 K).

== Examples ==
=== Pillars of Creation ===
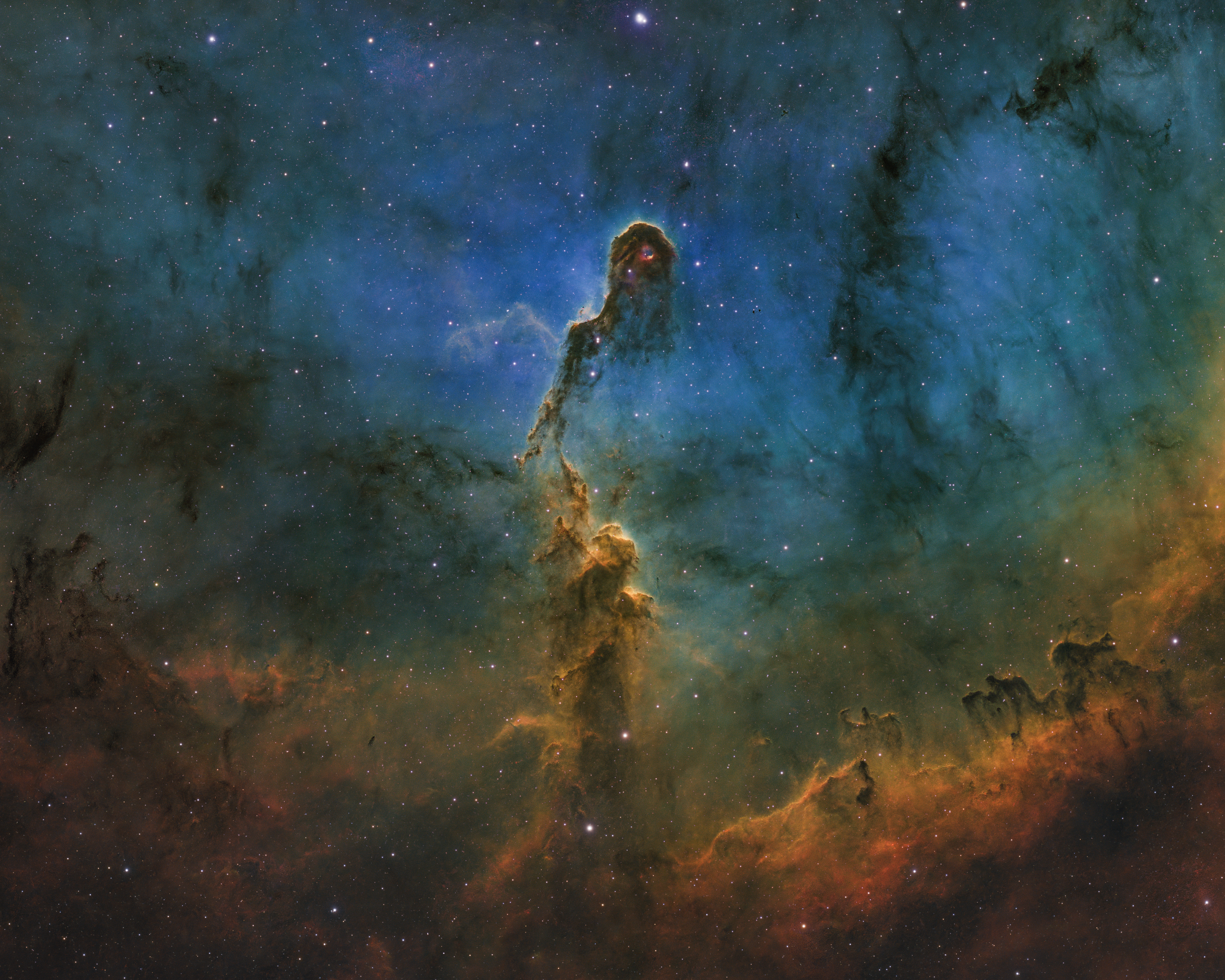
Elephant's Trunk Nebula (IC 1396A) in the emission nebulae IC 1396.

The Pillars of Creation are the most famous example of astronomic elephant trunks. NASA was able to produce a picture of this formation by compositing multiple images taken by the Hubble Space Telescope. It is located 7,000 light-years away, in the Eagle Nebula. There are multiple elephant trunks in the formation, one of which is approximately seven light-years long. Astronomers have made observations suggesting that the Pillars were possibly destroyed by the shock waves of a supernova 6,000 years ago.

=== Rosette Nebula ===
Dusty regions of the Rosette Nebula are an example of an unusual shape that an elephant trunk can assume. Regions like the "panther", a tall dust globule pointing to a star cluster above, have a small-scale double helix structure instead of the normal straight column. The double helix is caused by the presence of magnetic fields and electric currents lined up along the trunk axis of the trunks. This makes the filaments of the columns wavy instead of straight, as they are in normal trunks. These filaments wrap around each other rather than line up next to each other, which forms the twisted structure.

=== NGC 7822 ===
The star forming complex NGC 7822 in the constellation of Cepheus has several elephant trunk formations.
