= Sh 2-20 =

Emission nebula

Sharpless 2-20
Emission nebula
- H II region
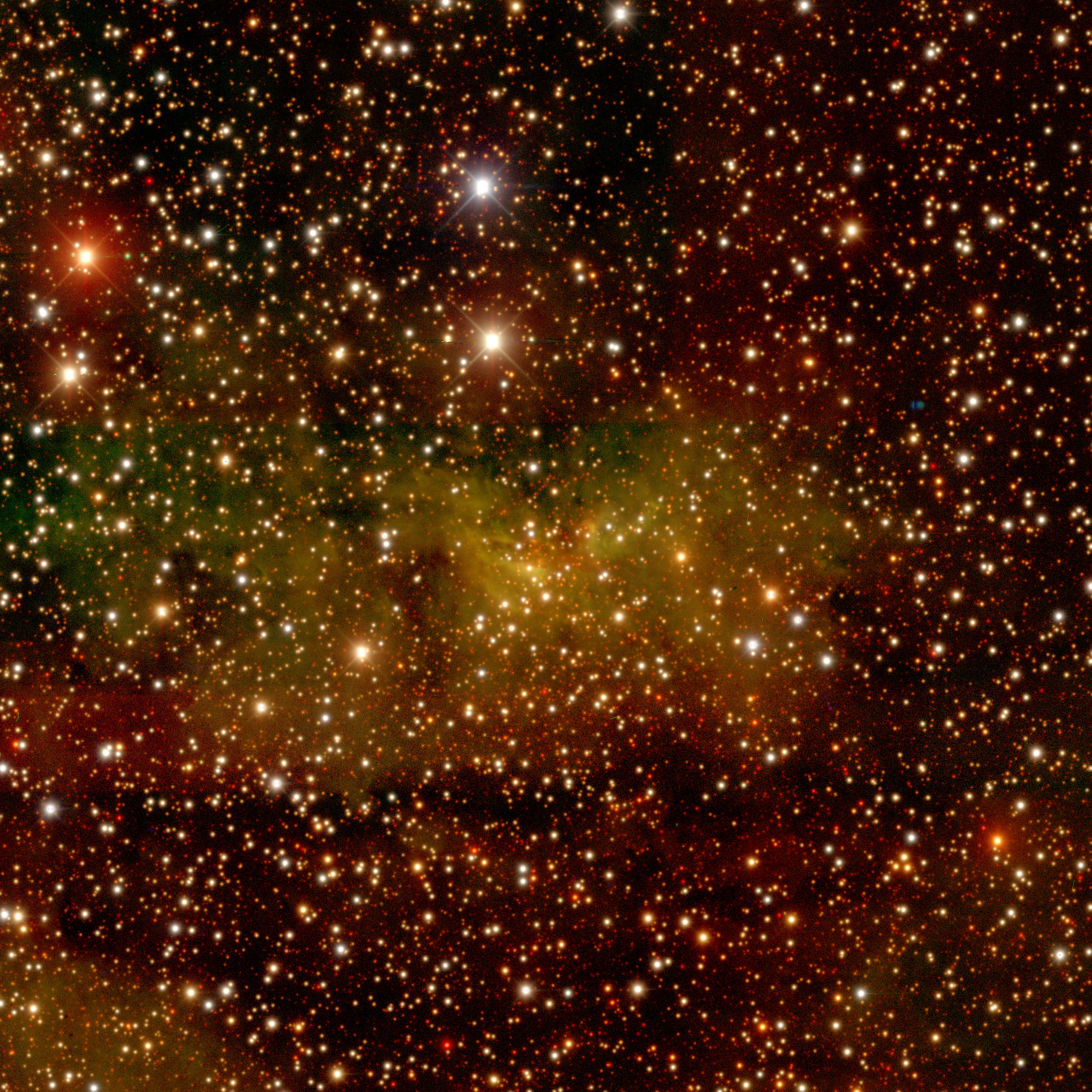
- As seen by the legacy survey

Observation data: J2000 epoch
- Right ascension: 17^{h} 47^{m} 08^{s}
- Declination: −28° 46′ 30″
- Distance: 4890 ly (1500 pc)
- Apparent magnitude (V): 15.74
- Apparent dimensions (V): 10'
- Constellation: Sagittarius

Physical characteristics
- Radius: 14 ly
- Designations: RCW 141, LBN 3, ESO 455-39, Minkowski 3-58, WSTB 19W96

Sh 2-20 is an emission nebula in the constellation Sagittarius. It is part of the Sharpless Catalog assembled by Stewart Sharpless. It lies next to the Sharpless objects Sh 2-15, Sh 2-16, Sh 2-17, Sh 2-18, and Sh 2-19. It contains the two infrared clusters, [DB2000] 5 and [DB2000] 6. It contains the radio source Seiradakis 36, of unknown origin.
