= Rosette Molecular Cloud =

Molecular cloud in the constellation Monoceros

Molecular cloud
- Giant molecular cloud
- Optical/X-ray Chandra image showing the RMC on the southeast (bottom left) corner.

Observation data: J2000 epoch
- Right ascension: 06^{h} 34^{m} 42.00^{s}
- Declination: +04° 01′ 60.0″
- Distance: ~5,000 ly
- Constellation: Monoceros
- Designations: TGU H1452

Rosette Molecular Cloud (RMC) also known as the Rosette Molecular Complex is a giant molecular cloud (GMC) of gas and dust located approximately ~5,000 ly away from earth. It was discovered in 1980 by L. Blitz and P. Thaddeus while they were conducting carbon monoxide (CO) observations on the Rosette Nebula.

== Structure ==
The RMC contains seven Phelps and Lada (PL) infrared clusters, 3 REFL infrared clusters, main cluster NGC 2244, and the Rosette Nebula. The PL and REFL infrared clusters tend to be located within the most massive clumps of the cloud, indicating that high-mass regions are required to form these clusters. The RMC also contains the Monoceros Ridge, which is a molecular cloud of gas and dust located 10 pc northwest from the Rosette Nebula. This ridge is interacting with the neighbouring Monoceros Loop. The cloud is highly active in star formation with the Monoceros OB2 association residing inside the RMC. A study detected 395 X-ray sources in the RMC, 299 of which have an optical or near-infrared (NIR) counterparts, while another study found YSOs interacting with the RMC, such as the parsec-scale YSO outflow designated as HH 871, with potential influence on the [S II] emission. The RMC exhibits a highly filamentary structure with dense cores covering a wide range of masses. These pre- and protostellar cores have masses ranging between 3-40 M_{☉}.

The highest temperatures are found northwest of the Rosette Nebula between the interacting Monoceros Ridge and Monoceros Loop, with temperatures around 30 K. The temperature gradually decreases southeast into the molecular cloud, dropping to around 10-15 K in remote areas. A study found that the 60 μm and 100 μm IRAS emission is strongest within both the molecular cloud and all of the Rosette Nebula region, while the 12 μm emission is less strong in the molecular cloud and inside the Rosette Nebula region.

The Monoceros Ridge and Monoceros Loop have densities of about 0.5 x 10³ cm⁻³, while more remote clouds surrounding clusters such as infrared clusters F and PL7 have a higher density of 1.8 x 10³ cm⁻³ and 3.9 x 10³ cm⁻³ respectively. The total mass of the complex is estimated at ~100,000 M_{☉}. Some notable structures, like the several point-like features, a 2 pc long jet-like feature, and a bow-shape feature all influence the RMC through [S II].
