= NGC 1624-2 =

O-type star in the constellation Perseus

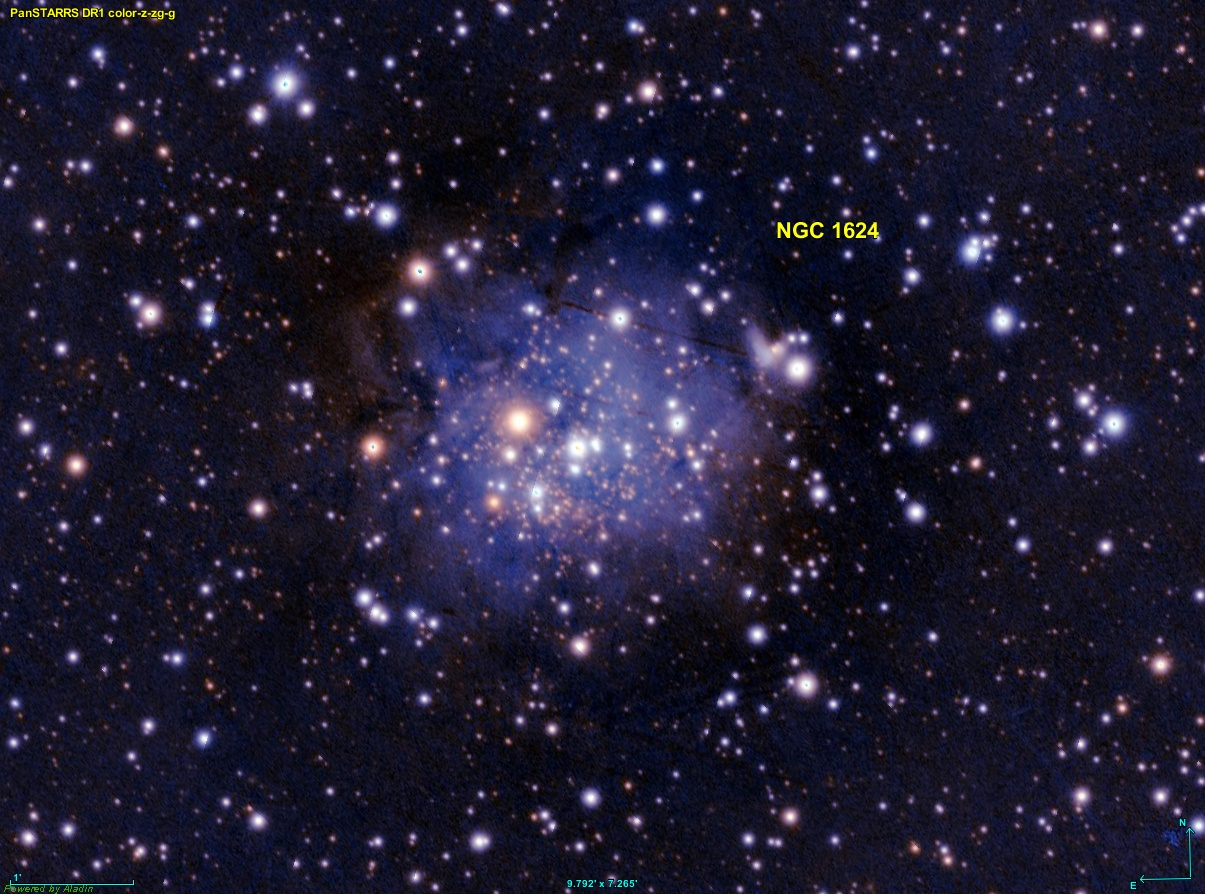
- NGC 1624-2 is the brightest star at the centre of NGC 1624

Observation data Epoch J2000 Equinox J2000
- Constellation: Perseus
- Right ascension: 04^{h} 40^{m} 37.276^{s}
- Declination: +50° 27′ 41.04″
- Apparent magnitude (V): 11.57

Characteristics
- Spectral type: O7f?cp
- U−B color index: −0.57
- B−V color index: 0.9

Astrometry
Proper motion (μ)	RA: 0.025 mas/yr Dec.: 0.108 mas/yr
Parallax (π)	−0.3521±0.1716 mas
Distance	5,152.3 pc

Details
Mass	34 M_{☉}
Radius	10 R_{☉}
Luminosity	126,000 L_{☉}
Surface gravity (log g)	3.55 cgs
Temperature	35,000 K
Metallicity [Fe/H]	+0.07 dex
Rotation	315.98 d
Rotational velocity (v sin i)	<3 km/s

Other designations
- TYC 3350-255-1, ALS 18660, 2MASS J04403728+5027410

Database references
SIMBAD	data

NGC 1624-2 is a massive O-type star located in the star cluster NGC 1624, in the constellation of Perseus, about 16,800 light years away. NGC 1624-2 is notable for being most strongly magnetised O-type star known, with a magnetic field strength of 20 kG, or about 20,000 times the Sun's magnetic field strength. It hosts a large and dense magnetosphere, formed from the interaction between its very strong magnetic field and its dense, radiatively-driven stellar wind, which also absorbs up to 95% of x-rays generated from around the star.

== Properties ==
NGC 1624-2 is a very massive, young, blue star no more than 4 million years old. It is an Of?p star a type of highly magnetic star that has unusual emission lines of multiply-ionized carbon and nitrogen. In NGC 1624-2, the carbon emission is particularly extreme. The luminosity class is uncertain because of the unusual spectrum; it is most commonly given as V (main sequence), but has also been given as I (supergiant).

Analysis of its spectral energy distribution with CHORIZOS modelling yields an effective temperature of 35,000 K, a luminosity of 125,900 L_{☉} (10×10^{5.1} L_{☉}) and a radius of about 10 R_{☉}. Assuming a log(g) of 4.0 yields a mass of 34 M_{☉}, but evolutionary models tend towards a current mass of 28 M_{☉}, given the results from the modelling. However, this assumes that NGC 1624-2 is a normal star, while it is not, so it should only be taken as an indication of its true mass. NGC 1624-2 is currently losing mass at a rate of 10^{−6.8} M_{☉}/year, through a stellar wind with a terminal velocity of 2,875 km/s.

=== Rotation ===
NGC 1624-2 rotates very slowly, only once every 316 days. This slow rotation is typical for very magnetic O-type stars as their magnetic fields slow down their rotation in a process known as magnetic braking, where angular momentum is quickly shed by the stellar wind via the strong magnetic field, which also minimises mass loss throughout the main sequence.
