= NGC 7822 =

Star forming region in the constellation Cepheus

Emission nebula
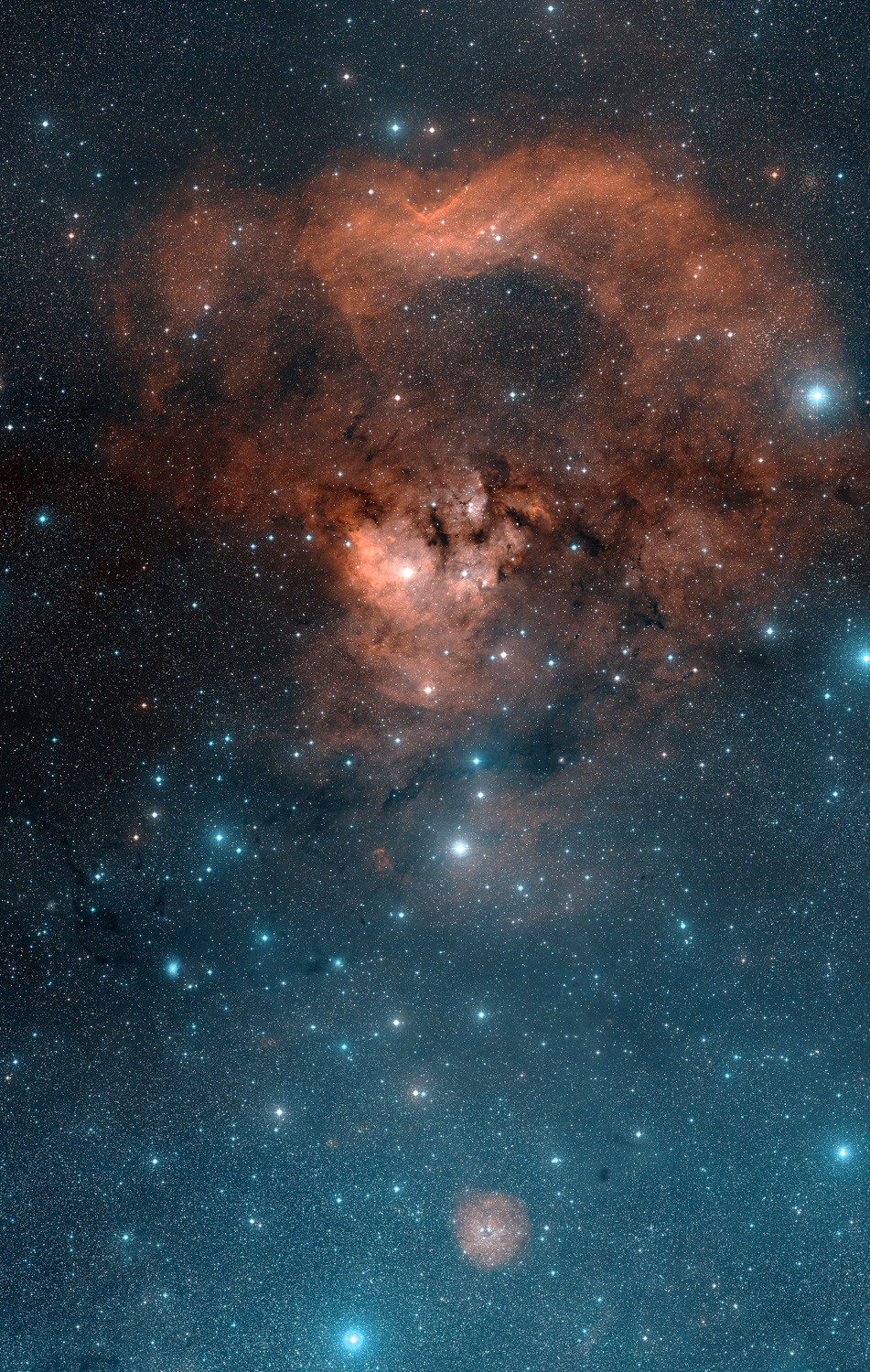
- Ced 214 and NGC 7822, with Sh2-170 at bottom

Observation data: J2000 epoch
- Right ascension: 00^{h} 01^{m} 08.58^{s}
- Declination: +67° 25′ 17.0″
- Distance: 2900 ly (900 pc)
- Apparent diameter: 100′
- Constellation: Cepheus

Physical characteristics
- Radius: 75 ly (23 pc)
- Designations: LBN 589, Sh 2-171

NGC 7822, also known as the Question Mark Nebula, is a young star forming complex in the constellation of Cepheus. The complex encompasses the emission region designated Sharpless 171, and the young cluster of stars named Berkeley 59. The complex is believed to be some 800–1000 pc distant, with the younger components aged no more than a few million years. The complex also includes one of the hottest stars discovered within 1 kpc of the Sun, namely BD+66 1673, which is an eclipsing binary system consisting of an O5V that exhibits a surface temperature of nearly 45,000 K and a luminosity about 100,000 times that of the Sun. The star is one of the primary sources illuminating the nebula and shaping the complex's famed pillars of creation-type formations, the elephant trunks.

Sharpless 2-170, or the Little Rosette Nebula. is located nearby. The two nebulae are not related, with NGC 7822 being about 4,600 light years away from each other.

== Gallery ==
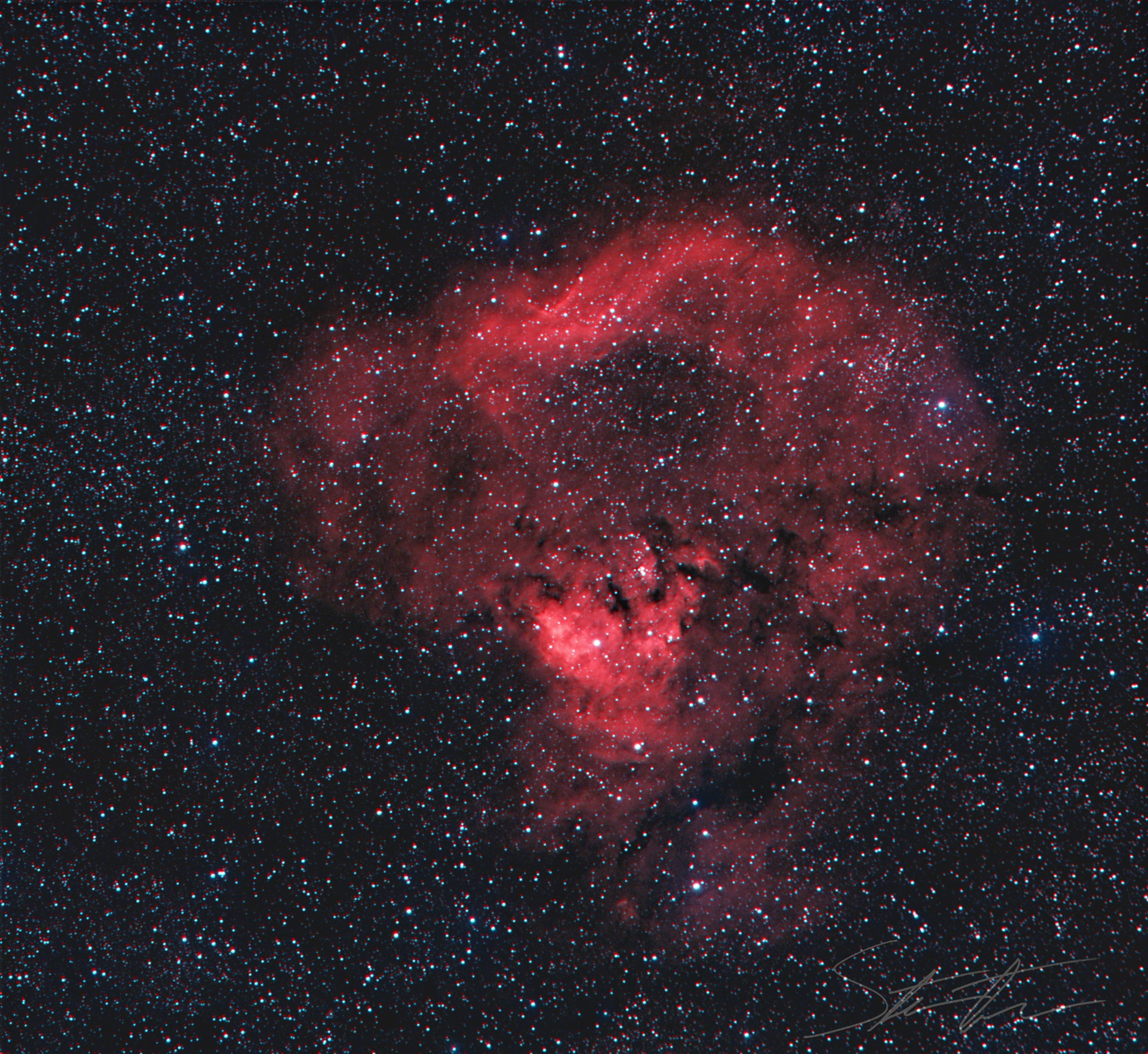
NGC 7822 by Sterling Tresierra

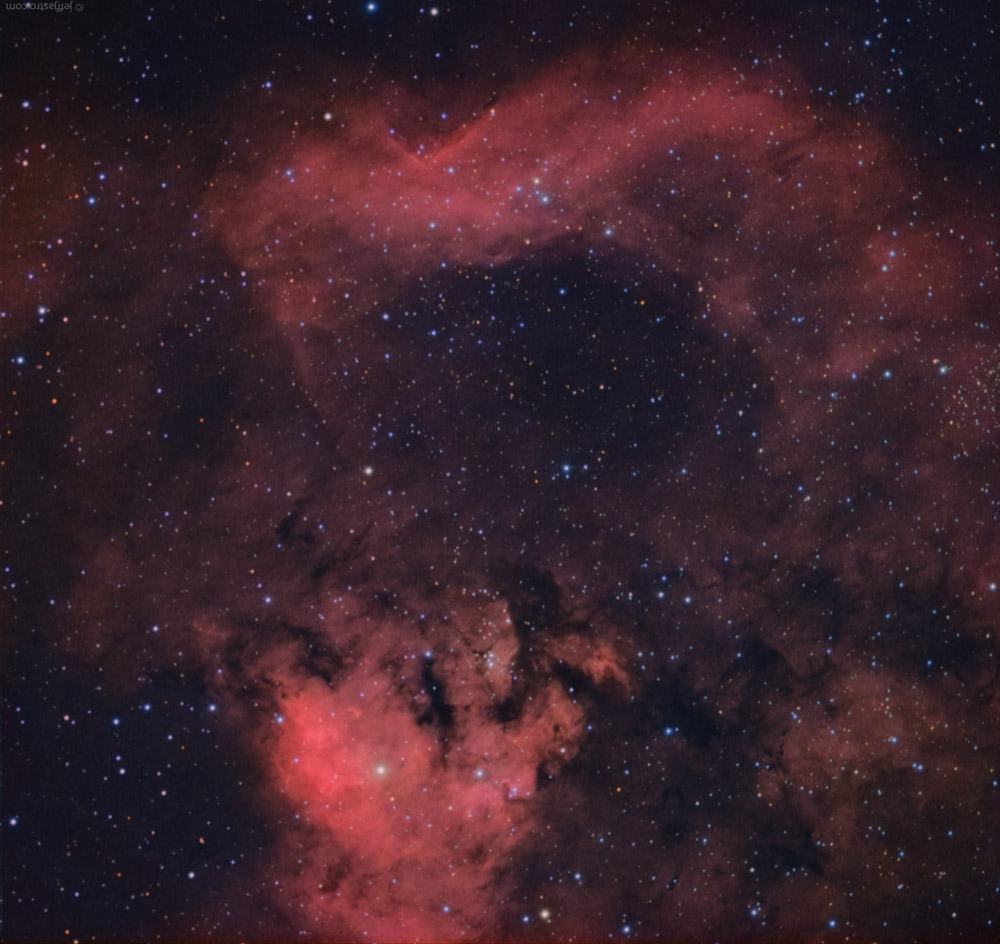
Amateur image of NGC 7822 by Jeff Johnson

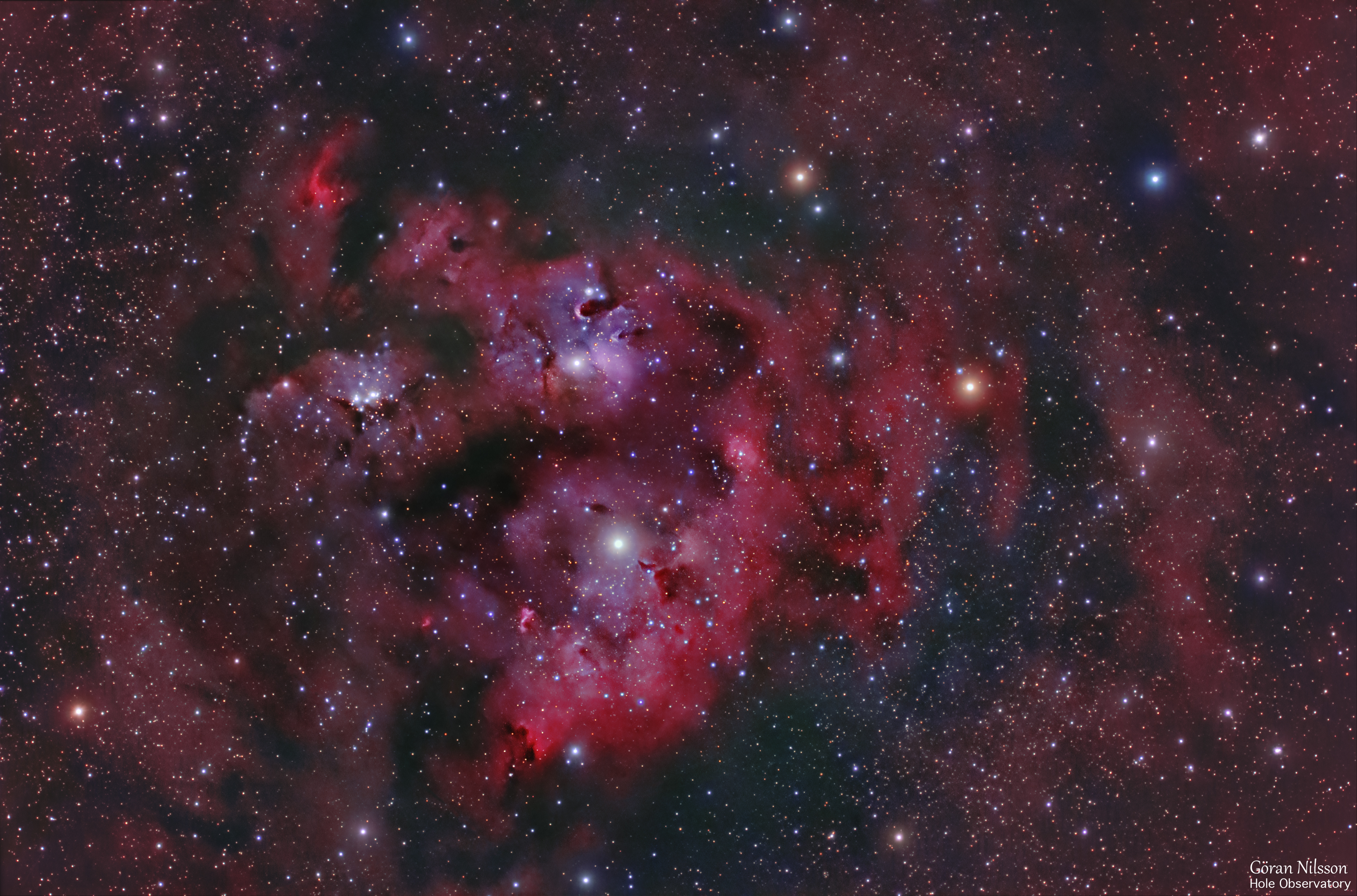
Amateur RGB image taken with a DSLR and 5" apochromatic refractor
