= NGC 1624 =

Open cluster in the constellation Perseus

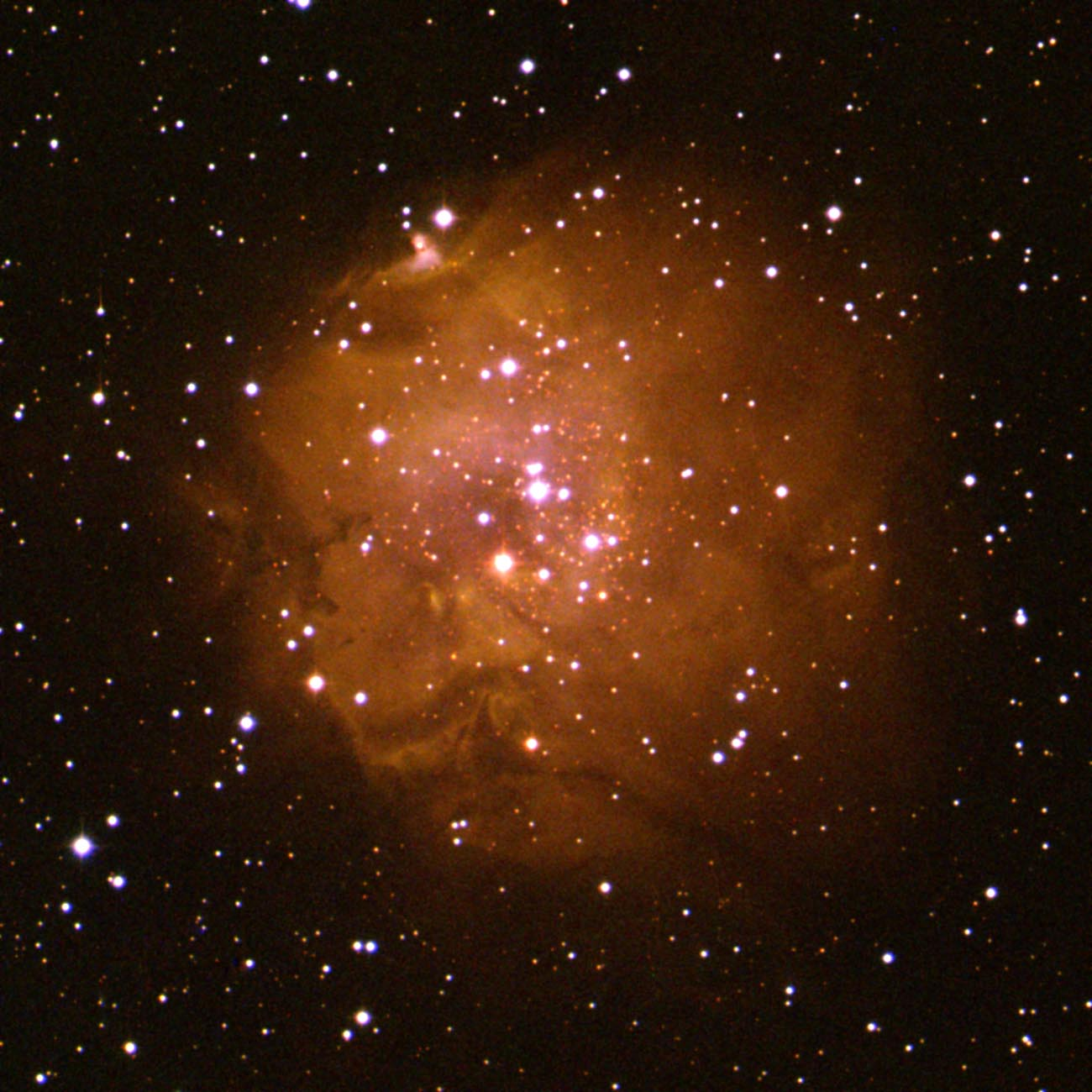
- Image of NGC 1624 with the Isaac Newton Telescope; Credit: IGAPS

Observation data (J2000 epoch)
- Right ascension: 04^{h} 40^{m} 36.0^{s}
- Declination: +50° 27′ 42″
- Distance: 20000 ± 2000 ly (6000 ± 600 pc)
- Apparent magnitude (V): 11.8

Physical characteristics
- Estimated age: <4 Myr
- Other designations: Cr 53, C 0436+503, OCl 403, Tribble Nebula, Little Cocoon Nebula

Associations
- Constellation: Perseus

NGC 1624, also known as Sh 2-212 in the Sharpless catalog, is a very young open cluster in the constellation Perseus inside an emission nebula. It was discovered by German-British astronomer William Herschel in December 1790. Together with the nearby nebula Sh 2-211, it forms part of the region nicknamed the Tribble Nebulae.

NGC 1624 is located approximately 20,000 ly (6,000 pc) from Earth, and latest estimates give it an age of less than 4 million years. Its apparent magnitude is 11.8, and apparent diameter is about 3.0 arc minutes. Its celestial location is right ascension (α) 04^{h} 40^{m} 36.0^{s} and declination (δ) +50° 27′ 42″, which is toward the Galactic anticenter. It is potentially an area of massive star formation.

According to Robert Trumpler's classification of open clusters, this cluster contains fewer than 50 stars (letter p) with a high concentration (I) and whose magnitudes are distributed over an average interval (number 2). The letter n at the end (I2pn) means that the cluster is inside a nebula.

== Gallery ==
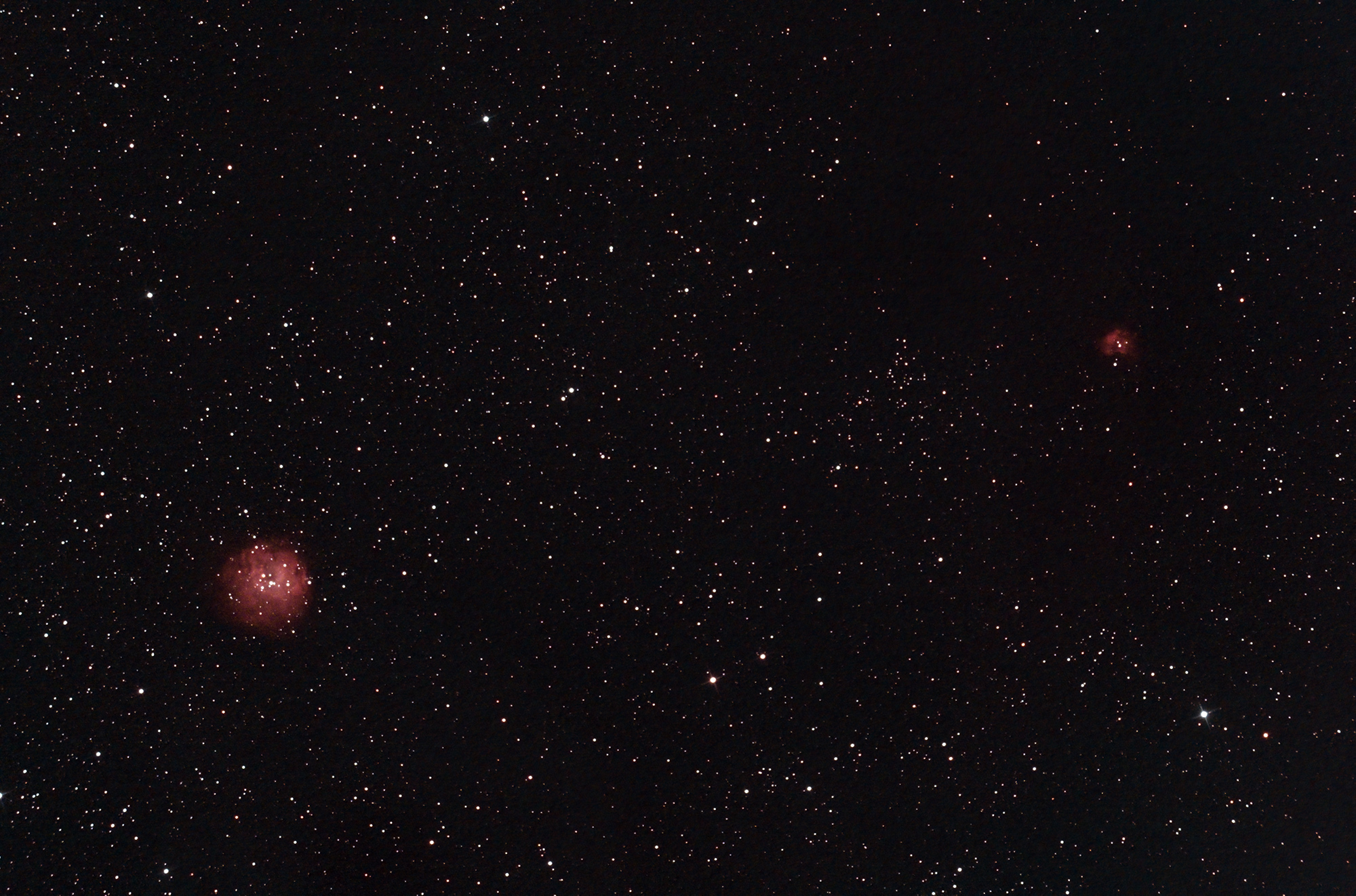
Wide-field view of Sh 2-211 and Sh 2-212 (the Tribble Nebulae)

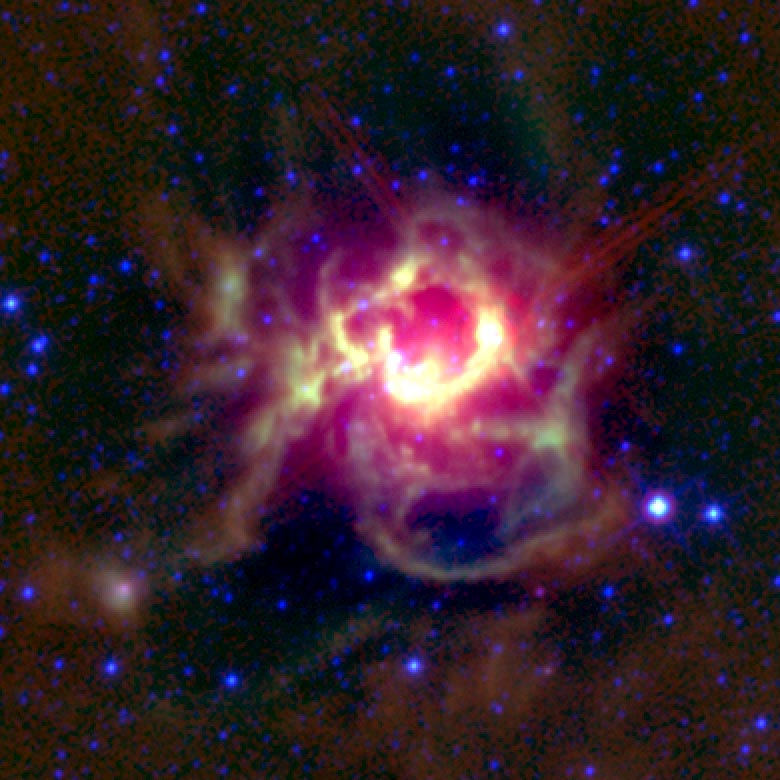
Mid-infrared view of NGC 1624 imaged by unWISE

== See also ==
- Cocoon Nebula
- Rosette Nebula
- Little Rosette Nebula
- Sh 2-82, also known as the 'Little Cocoon Nebula'
