= Evaporating gaseous globule =

Hydrogen gas region in outer space approximately 100 AU in size

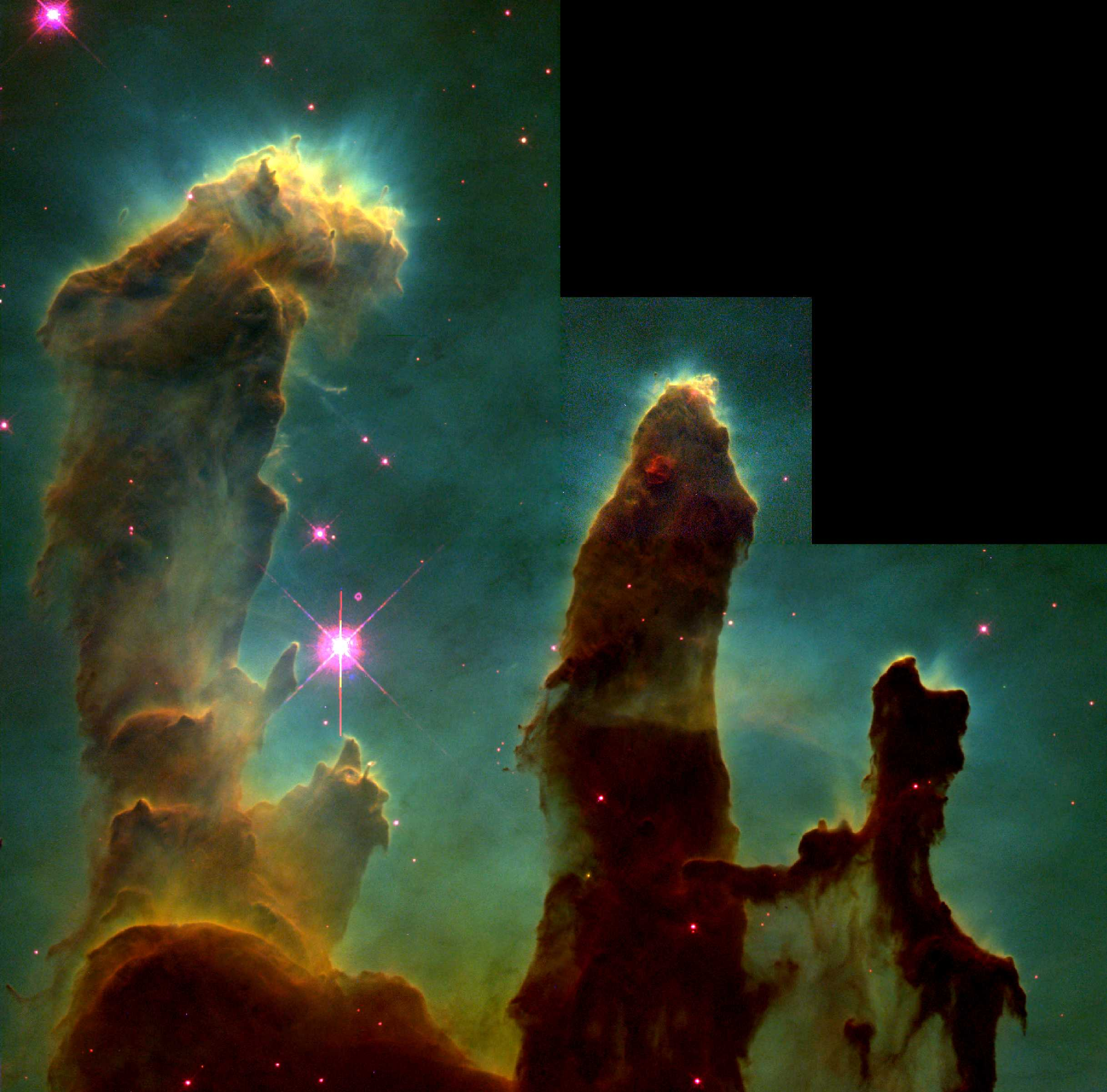
The "Pillars of Creation", in the Eagle Nebula contain EGGs, leading to the formation of incubating stars.

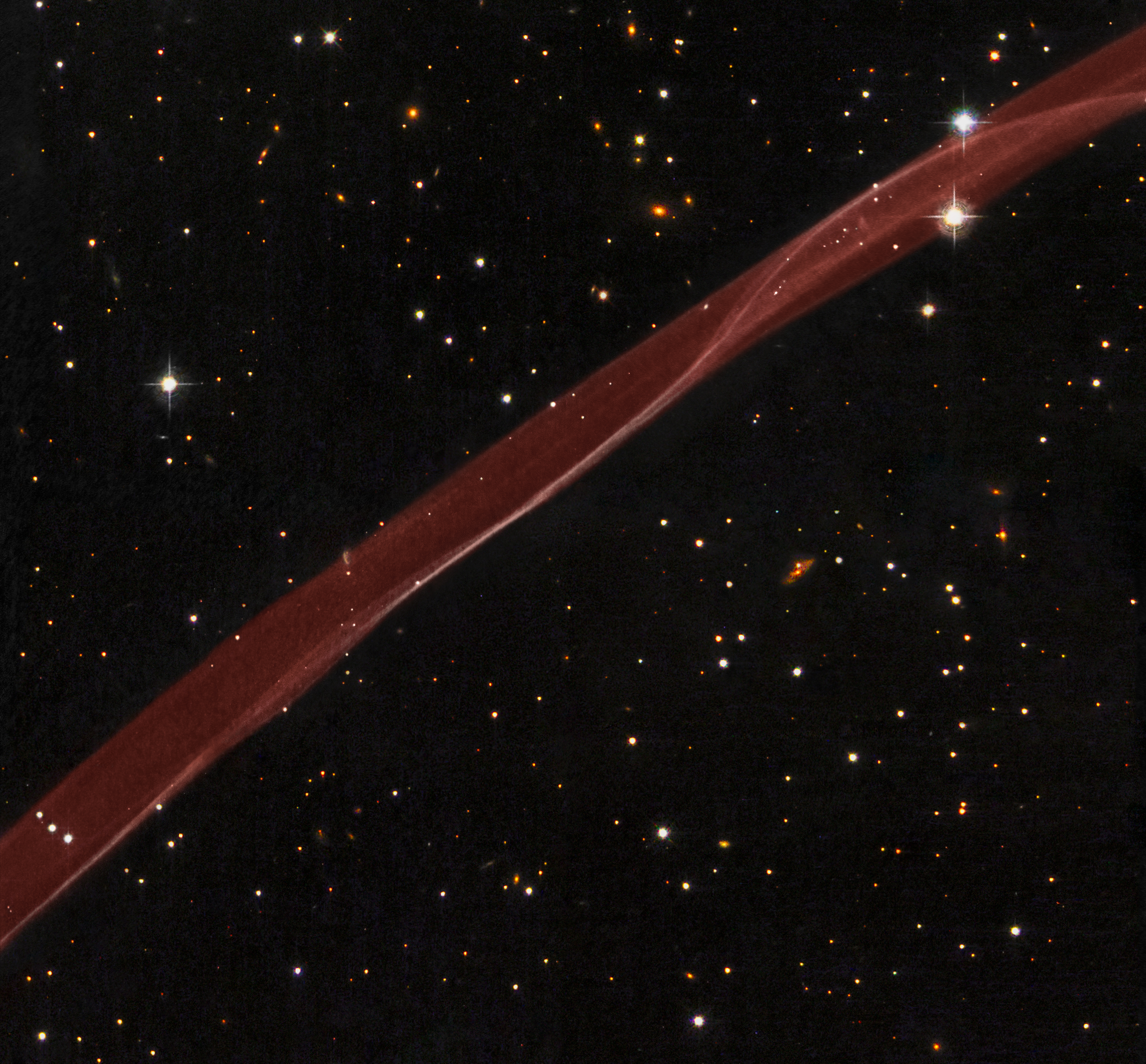
Knots or globules of denser gas in SN 1006.

An evaporating gas globule (EGG) is a region of hydrogen gas in outer space approximately 100 astronomical units in size, such that gases shaded by it are shielded from ionizing UV rays. Dense areas of gas shielded by an evaporating gas globule can be conducive to the birth of stars. Evaporating gas globules were first conclusively identified via photographs of the Pillars of Creation in the Eagle Nebula taken by the Hubble Space Telescope in 1995.

EGGs are the likely predecessors of new protostars. Inside an EGG the gas and dust are denser than in the surrounding dust cloud. Gravity pulls the cloud even more tightly together as the EGG continues to draw in material from its surroundings. As the cloud density builds up the globule becomes hotter under the weight of the outer layers, a protostar is formed inside the EGG.

A protostar may have too little mass to become a star. If so it becomes a brown dwarf. If the protostar has sufficient mass, the density reaches a critical level where the temperature exceeds 10 million kelvin at its center. At this point, a nuclear reaction starts converting hydrogen to helium and releasing large amounts of energy. The protostar then becomes a star and joins the main sequence on the HR diagram.

A study of 73 EGGs in the Pillars of Creation (Eagle Nebula) with the Very Large Telescope showed that only 15% of the EGGs show signs of star-formation. The star-formation is not everywhere the same: The largest pillar has a small cluster of these sources at the head of the pillar.
