= Sh 2-170 =

Emission nebula in the Cassiopeia constellation

Little Rosette Nebula
Emission nebula
- H II region
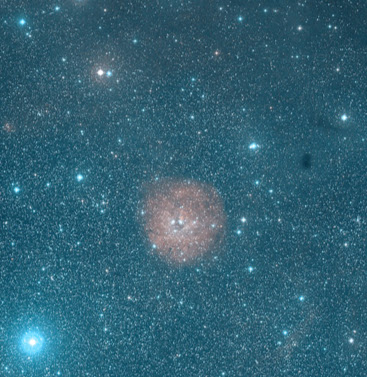
- Sh2-170 as seen by the Hubble Space Telescope

Observation data: epoch
- Right ascension: 00h 01m 29s
- Declination: +64° 39' 03"
- Distance: 7,500 ly
- Apparent magnitude (V): ~6.5
- Apparent dimensions (V): 56' x 50'
- Constellation: Cassiopeia
- Designations: LBN 577, Sh 2-170, LBN 117.62+02.29

Sharpless 2-170, also known by the common name the Little Rosette Nebula, is an emission nebula in the constellation Cassiopeia.

It was discovered by Stewart Sharpless in the late 1950s, and its discovery published in 1959. It is named after the larger, much more well known Rosette Nebula. It is located in the Perseus Arm of the Milky Way galaxy. Although being a separate nebula, it is considered as the dot in the Question Mark Nebula, as an extension of NGC 7822.

The nebula contains a central star cluster, Stock 18. Stock 18, has an apparent size much smaller than the nebula's total of 56 x 50 arcminutes, with the cluster having an apparent size of just 18 arcminutes. Some of its illumination is caused by the ionizing of gas by the star BD + 63 2093, also designated LS I +64 11. There is dispute between studies as to the nature of said central star. A 1995 paper concluded the star was a O8 V type, however other papers have identified it as a O9 V type, and SIMBAD labels it as a G5 star. The nebula contains a total of 71 variable stars.

== Visibility ==
Sh 2-170 has a magnitude of about 6.5. It is best viewed with a hydrogen-alpha filter. Most of the nebula is faint enough that it requires a longer exposure time to be visible to cameras.

== See also ==
- Rosette Nebula
- NGC 1624, the Little Cocoon Nebula
