= NGC 1193 =

Open cluster in the constellation Perseus

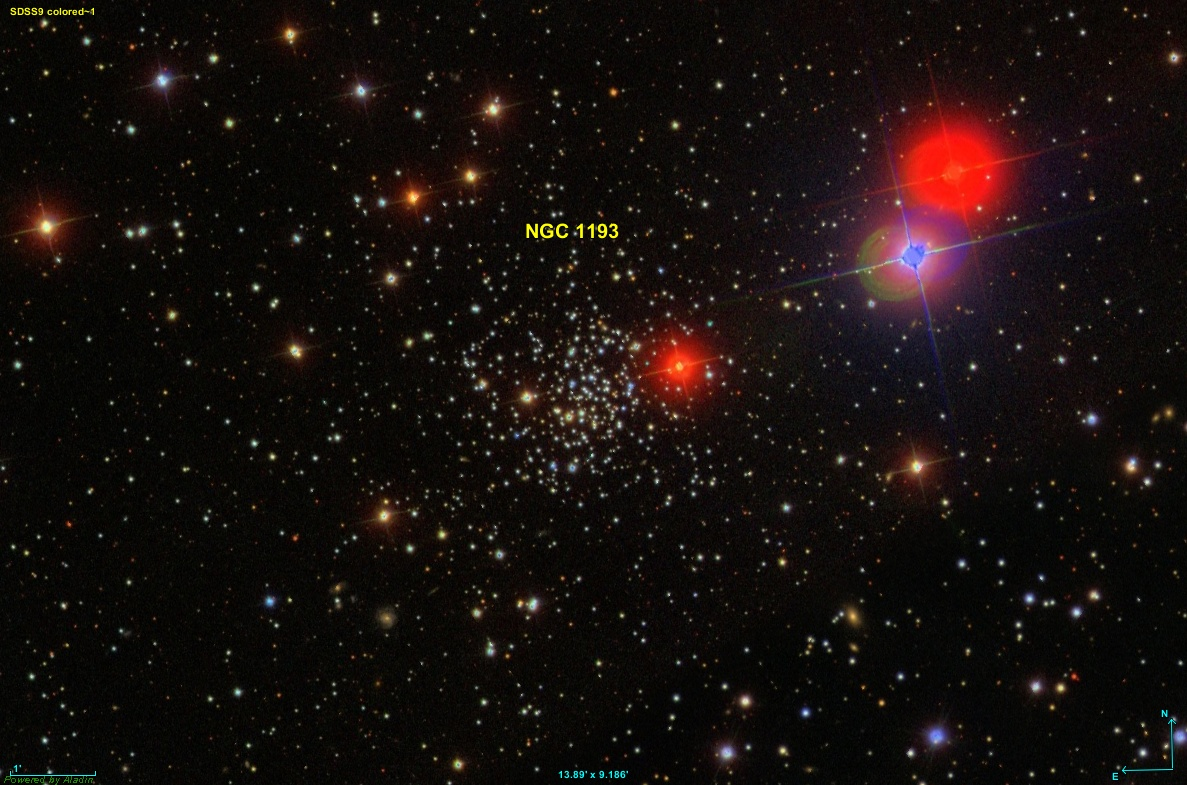

Observation data (J2000 epoch)
- Right ascension: 03^{h} 05^{m} 55.0^{s}
- Declination: +44° 23′ 00″
- Distance: ~14024 ly from the sun (4300 pc)
- Apparent magnitude (V): 12.6
- Apparent dimensions (V): 3.0 arcmin

Physical characteristics
- Other designations: OCL 390

Associations

NGC 1193 is an open cluster in the constellation Perseus. It was first observed and catalogued by astronomer William Herschel in 1786. The cluster is estimated to be approximately 4.2 billion years old.

== Stellar population ==
NGC 1193 is usually classified as a Trumpler type II3m, indicating its stellar population have a wide range of brightness, from very bright to faint stars and little star concentration in the center of the cluster. The letter 'm' on the Trumpler classification indicates a population of 50 to a 100 stars. However a study released in 2022 indicates a population of approximately 181 stars in the cluster, possibly changing the type from II3m to II3r. A photometric study of this galaxy carried out in 1988 revealed a small population of 5 blue straggler stars, a number of subgiant branch stars and red giant branch stars.

== See also ==
- Hyades (star cluster)
- Trapezium Cluster
- Eagle Nebula
