= Infrared cluster =

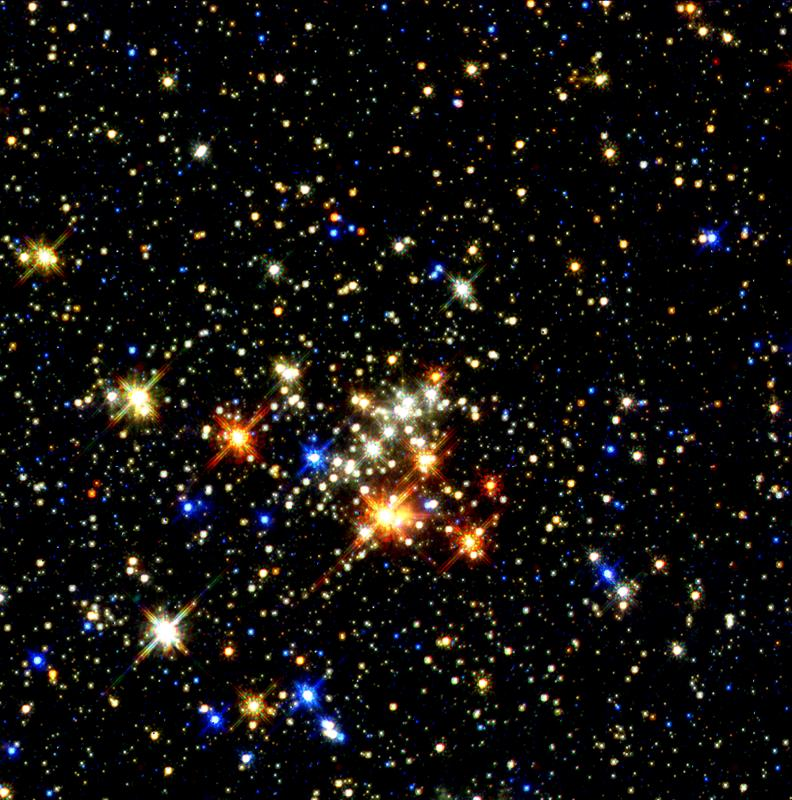
The Quintuplet Cluster, seen here by the Hubble Space Telescope, is an infrared cluster located near the galactic center.

An infrared cluster is a type of star cluster only visible in infrared light. Prominent examples include the Quintuplet Cluster, Arches Cluster and central star cluster of RCW 38. Other nebulae that contain infrared clusters include Sh 2-4, Sh 2-16, Sh 2-17, and Sh 2-20.

== Properties ==
Clusters become infrared clusters when all visible light is obscured by gas and dust, usually in areas of high star formation. An example of a place these conditions are common is the Carina Nebula, where as many as twelve may exist. Nine have been identified in the Rosette Nebula. Due to only being visible in infrared light, spectroscopy is nearly impossible. This also makes measuring the movement, and identifying features within an infrared cluster difficult or impossible. Infrared clusters are generally smaller than open clusters. This can be explained by the tidal forces in the dense regions infrared clusters are locating being strong enough to rip apart said clusters before they become as massive as older examples of clusters in less dense regions of space. Infrared clusters can contain protostars, and protoplanetary discs.

== Observational history ==
Observation of infrared clusters was impossible until infrared astronomy had become advanced enough to properly detect and study them, in the 1990s. One of the earliest discovered was the Quintuplet Cluster in 1983. In 2002, a catalogue of Infrared clusters was assembled. 189 true clusters were identified, and 87 further stellar associations were included.

== See also ==
- List of infrared clusters
