= Pillars of Creation =

Astrophotograph by the Hubble Space Telescope

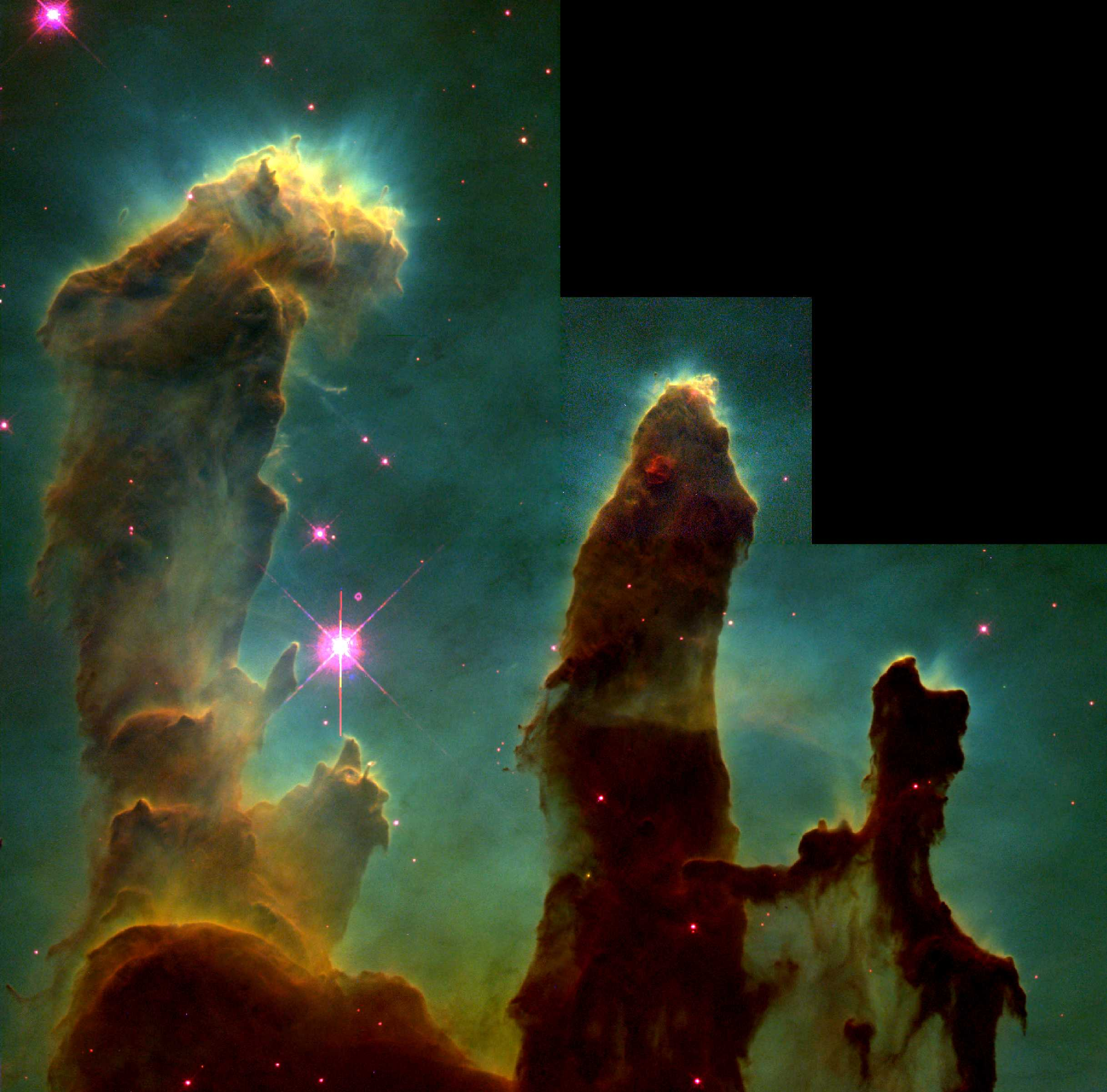
The Pillars of Creation in the Eagle Nebula taken by the Hubble Space Telescope in 1995

"Pillars of Creation" within the Eagle Nebula (animation; 0:15; 11 November 2022)

This video clip shows a visualization of the three-dimensional structure of the Pillars of Creation.

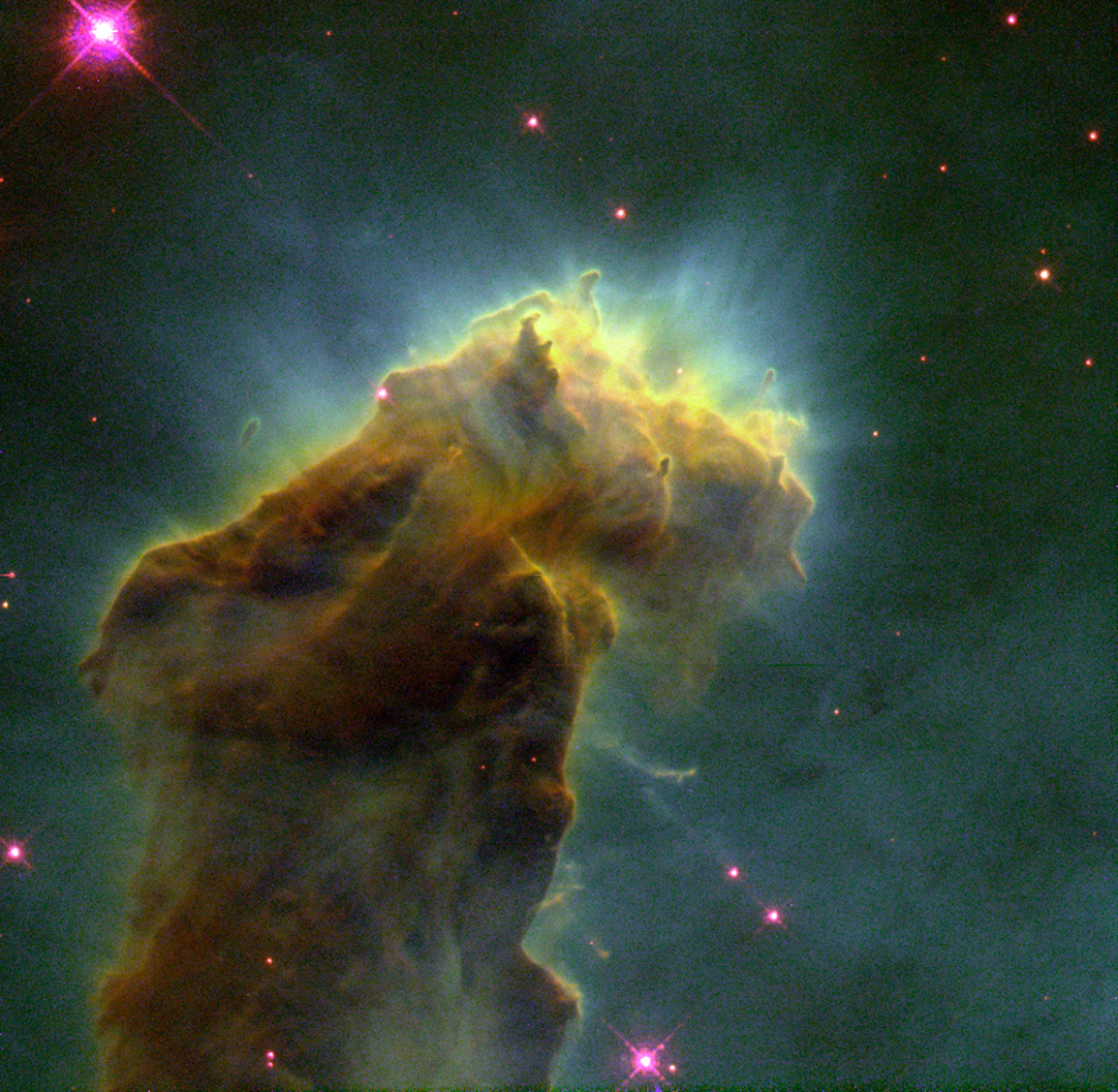
Closer view of one pillar

Pillars of Creation is a photograph taken by the Hubble Space Telescope that depicts elephant trunks of interstellar gas and dust in the Eagle Nebula of the constellation Serpens, some 6,500–7,000 light-years (2,000–2,100 pc) from Earth. These elephant trunks had been discovered by John Charles Duncan in 1920 on a plate made with the Mount Wilson Observatory 60-inch telescope. They are so named because the gas and dust are in the process of creating new stars, while also being eroded by the light from nearby stars that have recently formed.

Taken on April 1, 1995, it was named one of the top ten photographs from Hubble by Space.com. The astronomers responsible for the photo were Jeff Hester and Paul Scowen from Arizona State University. The region was rephotographed by ESA's Herschel Space Observatory in 2011, again by Hubble in 2014 with a newer camera, and the James Webb Space Telescope in 2022.

Released in 2007, Chandra X-ray Observatory (AXAF) had observed the area in 2001. It did not find many X-ray sources in the towers but was able to observe sources at various X-ray energy levels in the area from young stars.

The image is noted for its global culture impact, being considered the most iconic picture taken by the Hubble Space Telescope and National Geographic noting on its 20th anniversary that the image had been featured on everything from "t-shirts to coffee-mugs".

== Name ==
The name is based on a phrase used by Charles Spurgeon in his 1857 sermon "The Condescension of Christ":

In calling the Hubble's spectacular new image of the Eagle Nebula the Pillars of Creation, NASA scientists were tapping a rich symbolic tradition with centuries of meaning, bringing it into the modern age. As much as we associate pillars with the classical temples of Greece and Rome, the concept of the pillars of creation – the very foundations that hold up the world and all that is in it – reverberates significantly in the Christian tradition. When William Jennings Bryan published The World's Famous Orations in 1906, he included an 1857 sermon by London pastor Charles Haddon Spurgeon titled "The Condescension of Christ". In it, Spurgeon uses the phrase to convey not only the physical world but also the force that keeps it all together, emanating from the divine: "And now wonder, ye angels," Spurgeon says of the birth of Christ, "the Infinite has become an infant; he, upon whose shoulders the universe doth hang, hangs at his mother's breast; He who created all things, and bears up the pillars of creation, hath now become so weak, that He must be carried by a woman!"

== Composition ==
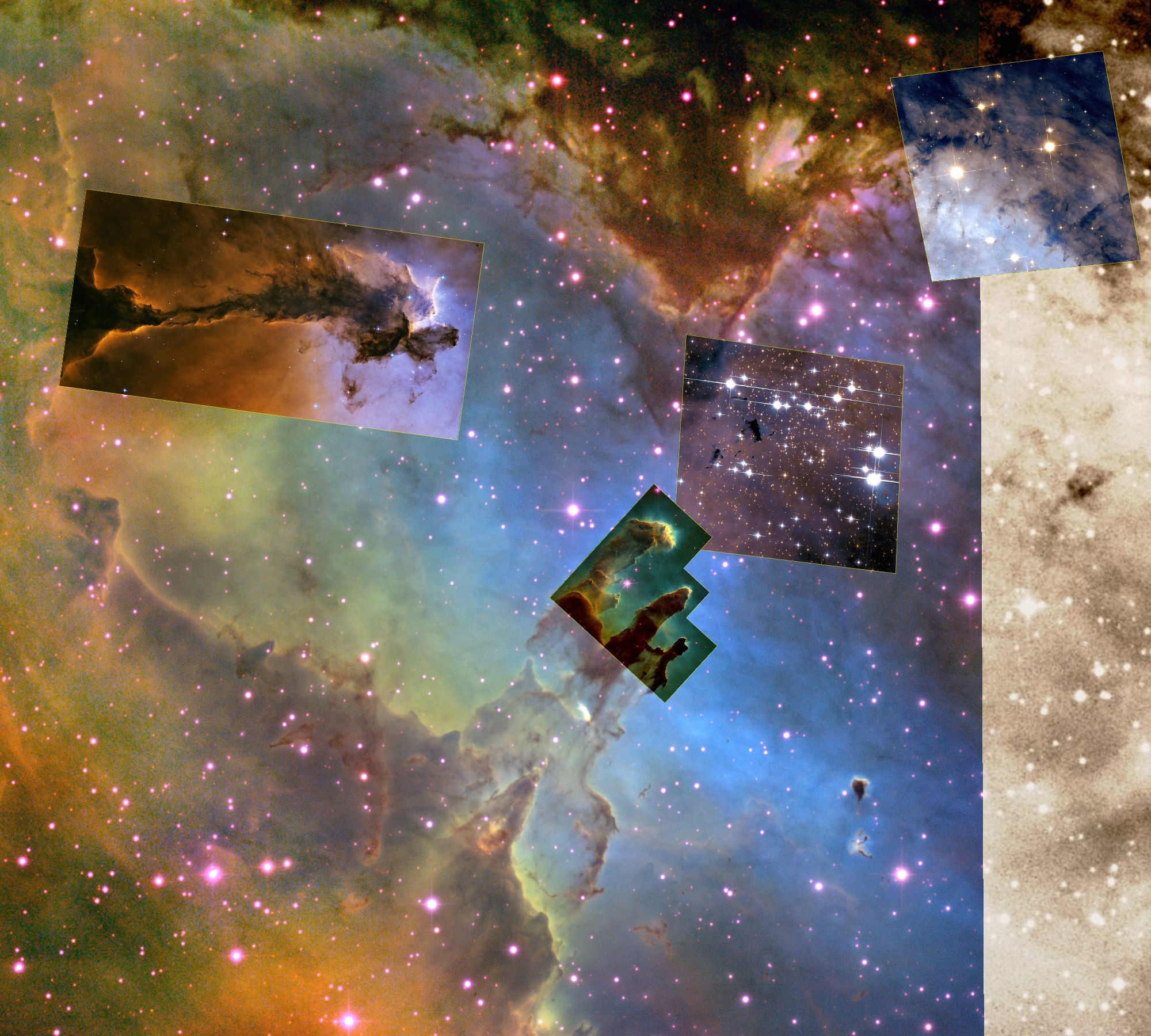
The Pillars of Creation within the Eagle Nebula (center of photo, overlaid with the original HST image)

The pillars are composed of cool molecular hydrogen and dust that are being eroded by photoevaporation from the ultraviolet light of relatively close and hot stars. The leftmost pillar is about four light-years in length. The finger-like protrusions at the top of the clouds are larger than the Solar System, and are made visible by the shadows of evaporating gaseous globules (EGGs), which shield the gas behind them from intense UV flux. EGGs are themselves incubators of new stars. The stars then emerge from the EGGs, which then are evaporated.

== Hypothesized destruction ==
Images taken with the Spitzer Space Telescope uncovered a cloud of dust in the vicinity of the Pillars of Creation that hypothetically could be a shock wave produced by a supernova. The appearance of the cloud suggests the supernova shockwave would have destroyed the Pillars of Creation 6,000 years ago. Given the distance of roughly 7,000 light-years between Earth and the Pillars of Creation and that light travels at a finite speed, this destruction should be visible from Earth in about 1,000 years.

This interpretation of the hot dust has been disputed by an astronomer uninvolved in the Spitzer observations, who argues that a supernova should have resulted in stronger radio and x-ray radiation than has been observed, and that winds from massive stars could instead have heated the dust. If this is the case, the Pillars of Creation will undergo a more gradual erosion.

== Photographs ==
=== Original Hubble Space Telescope photo ===
Hubble's photo of the pillars is composed of 32 different images from four CCD sensors in the Wide Field and Planetary Camera 2 on board Hubble. The photograph was made with light emitted by different elements in the cloud and appears as a different color in the composite image: green for hydrogen, red for singly ionized sulfur and blue for double-ionized oxygen atoms.

The "stair-shaped" missing part of the picture at the top right corner originates from the fact that the camera for the top-right quadrant has a magnified view; when its images are scaled down to match the other three cameras, there is necessarily a gap in the rest of that quadrant. This effect is also present on other WFPC2 images, and can be displayed at any corner depending on how the image has been re-oriented for publication.

The Wide Field and Planetary Camera 2 was replaced by the Wide Field Camera 3, and the former was taken back to Earth where it is displayed in the National Air and Space Museum. It was replaced in 2009 as part of a Space Shuttle mission (STS-125).

=== Herschel's photo ===
In 2010 Herschel Space Observatory captured a new image of the Pillars of Creation in far-infrared wavelengths, which allows astronomers to look inside the pillars and structures in the region, and come to a much fuller understanding of the creative and destructive forces inside the Eagle Nebula.

=== Revisits ===
In celebration of the 25th anniversary since the launch of the Hubble Space Telescope, astronomers assembled a larger and higher-resolution photograph of the Pillars of Creation which was unveiled in January 2015 at the American Astronomical Society meeting in Seattle. The image was photographed by the Hubble Telescope's Wide Field Camera 3, installed in 2009, in visible light. An infrared image was also taken. The re-imaging has a wider view that shows more of the base of the nebulous columns.

In October 2022, it was unveiled that the James Webb Space Telescope captured a new image of the Pillars of Creation utilizing the NIRCam aboard the spacecraft. The image was able to capture ejections from the formation of young stars still in development in great detail, as seen by the red spots near the edges of the pillars.

The most recent visualization of the Pillars of Creation was released by NASA in June 2024. It is a 3D rendering created by images from both the James Webb Space Telescope and the Hubble Space Telescope. NASA described it as "the most comprehensive and detailed multiwavelength movie yet of this star-birthing region."

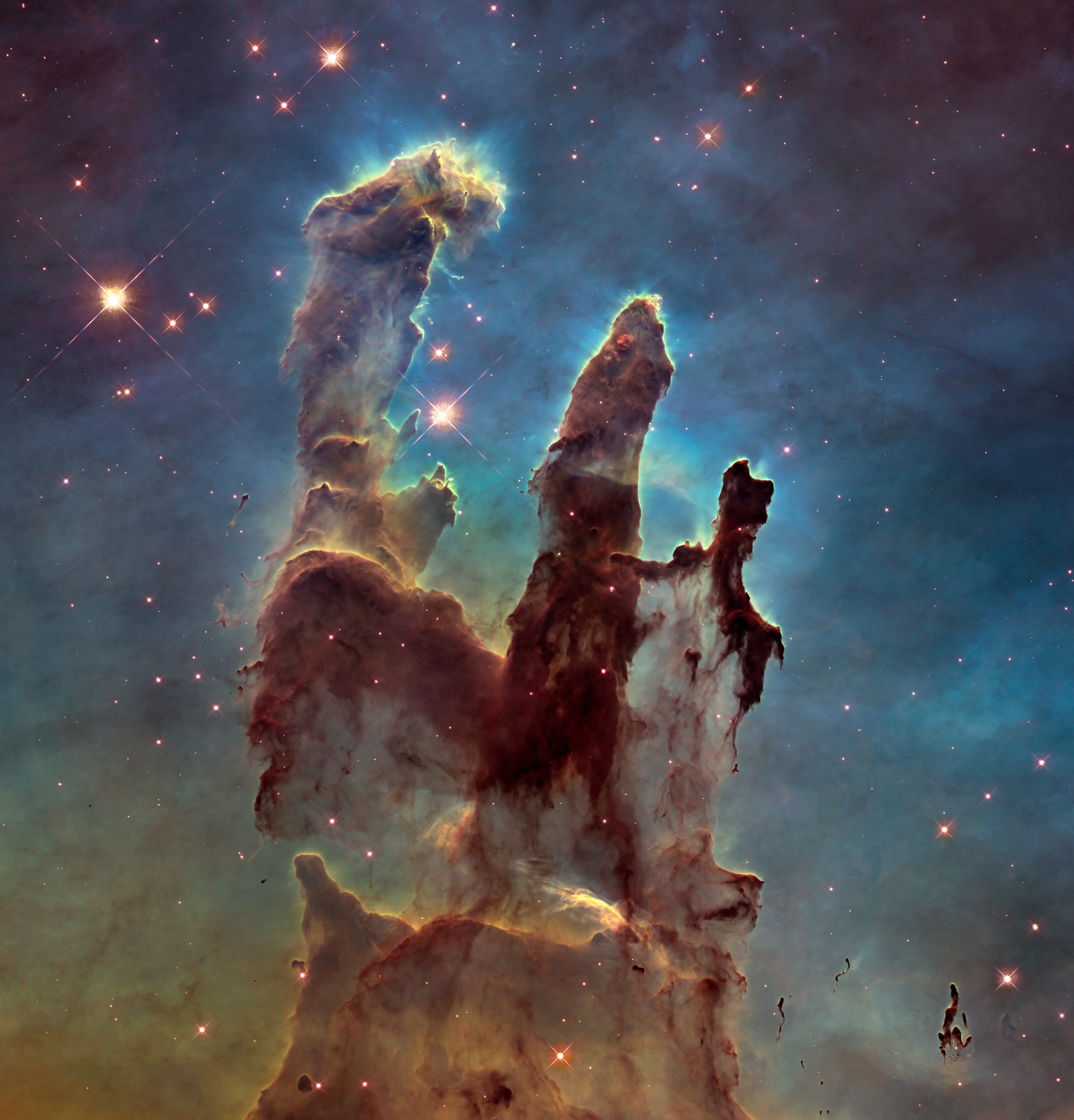
A higher-resolution Hubble Space Telescope image of the Pillars of Creation, taken in 2014 as a tribute to the original photograph

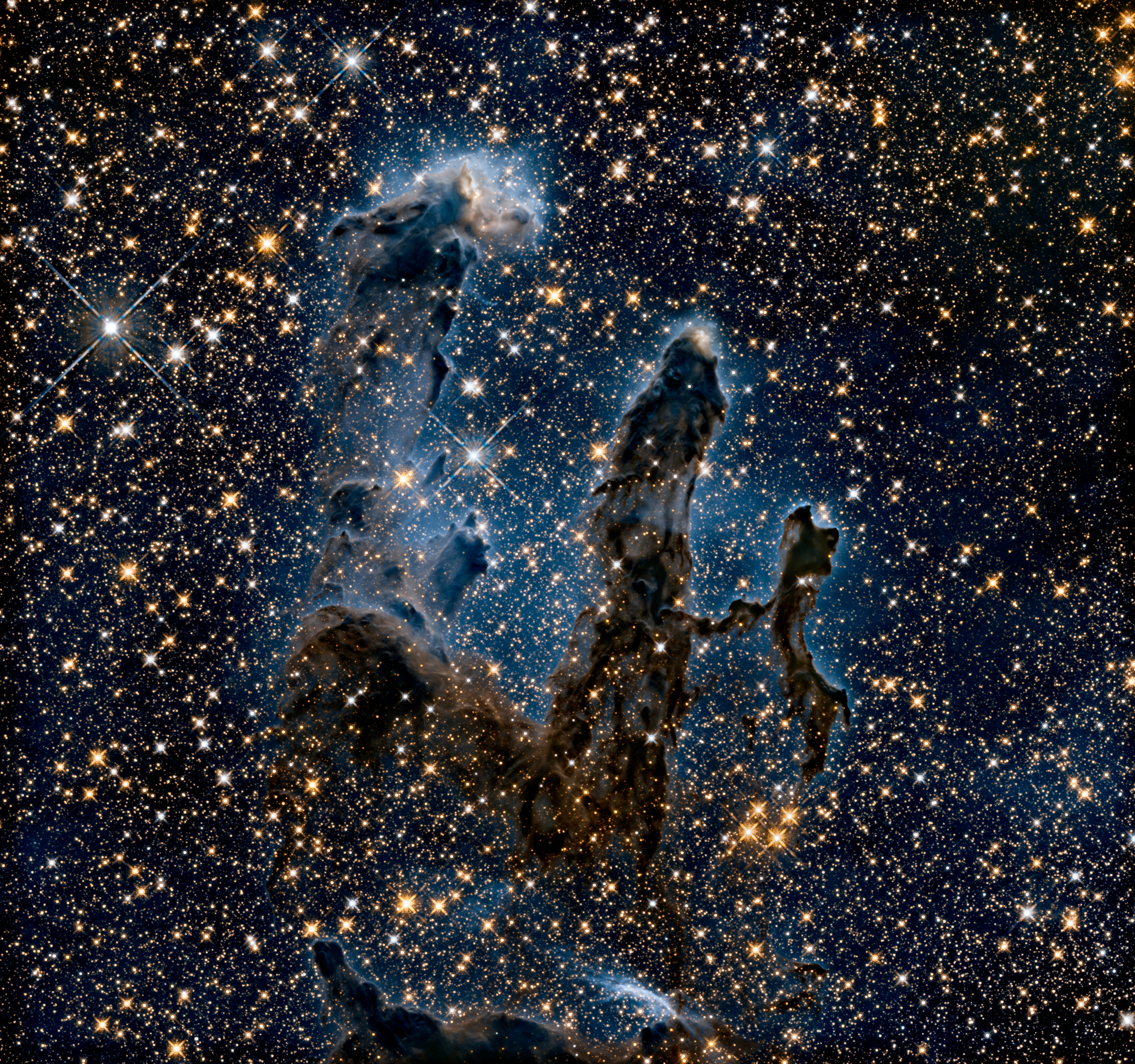
Infrared image taken by the Hubble Space Telescope in 2014

Near-infrared taken by the James Webb Space Telescope in 2022

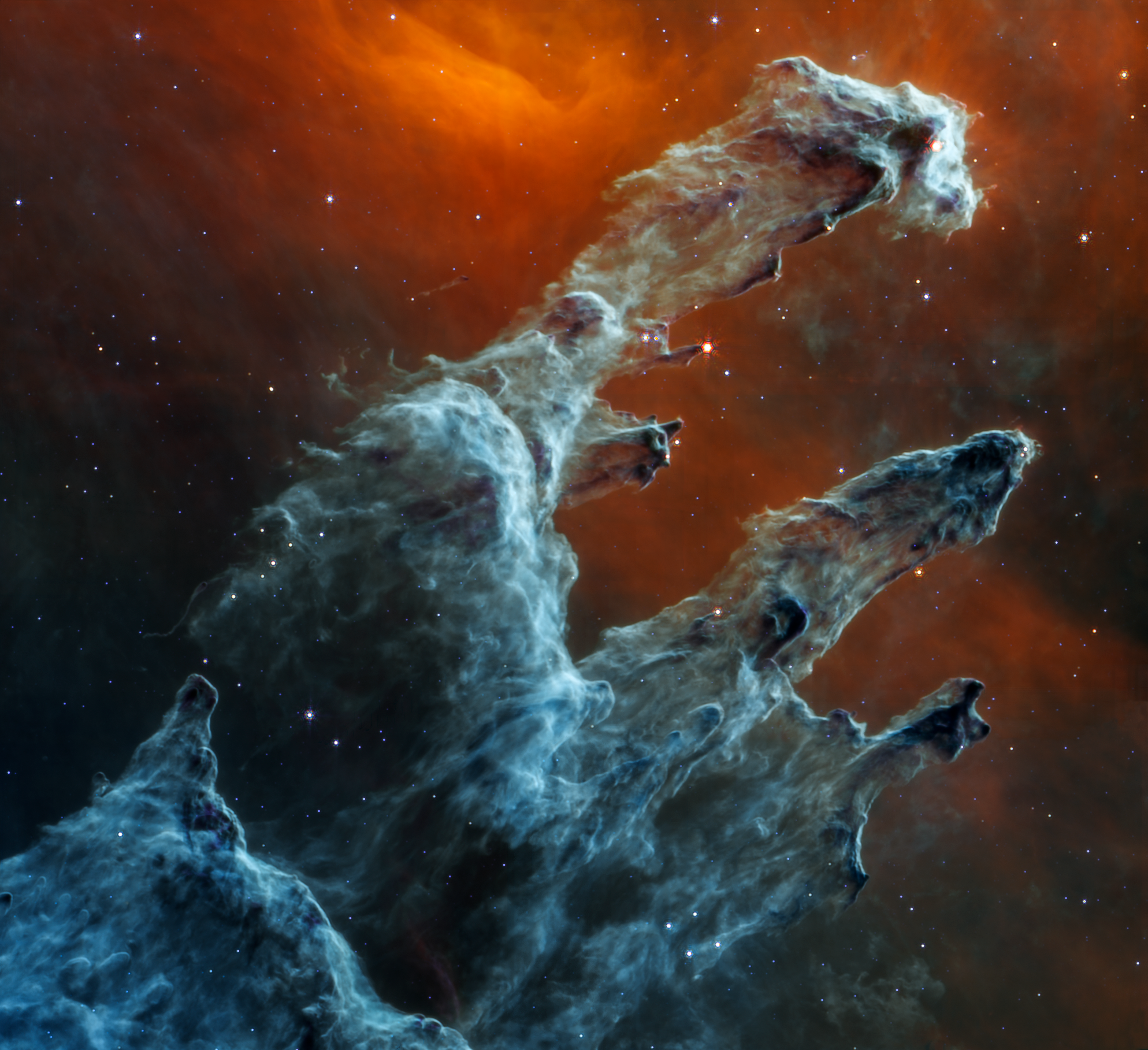
JWST's mid-infrared view of the Pillars of Creation, 2022

== See also ==
- List of photographs considered the most important
