= RCW 38 =

Emission nebula and star cluster in the constellation Vela

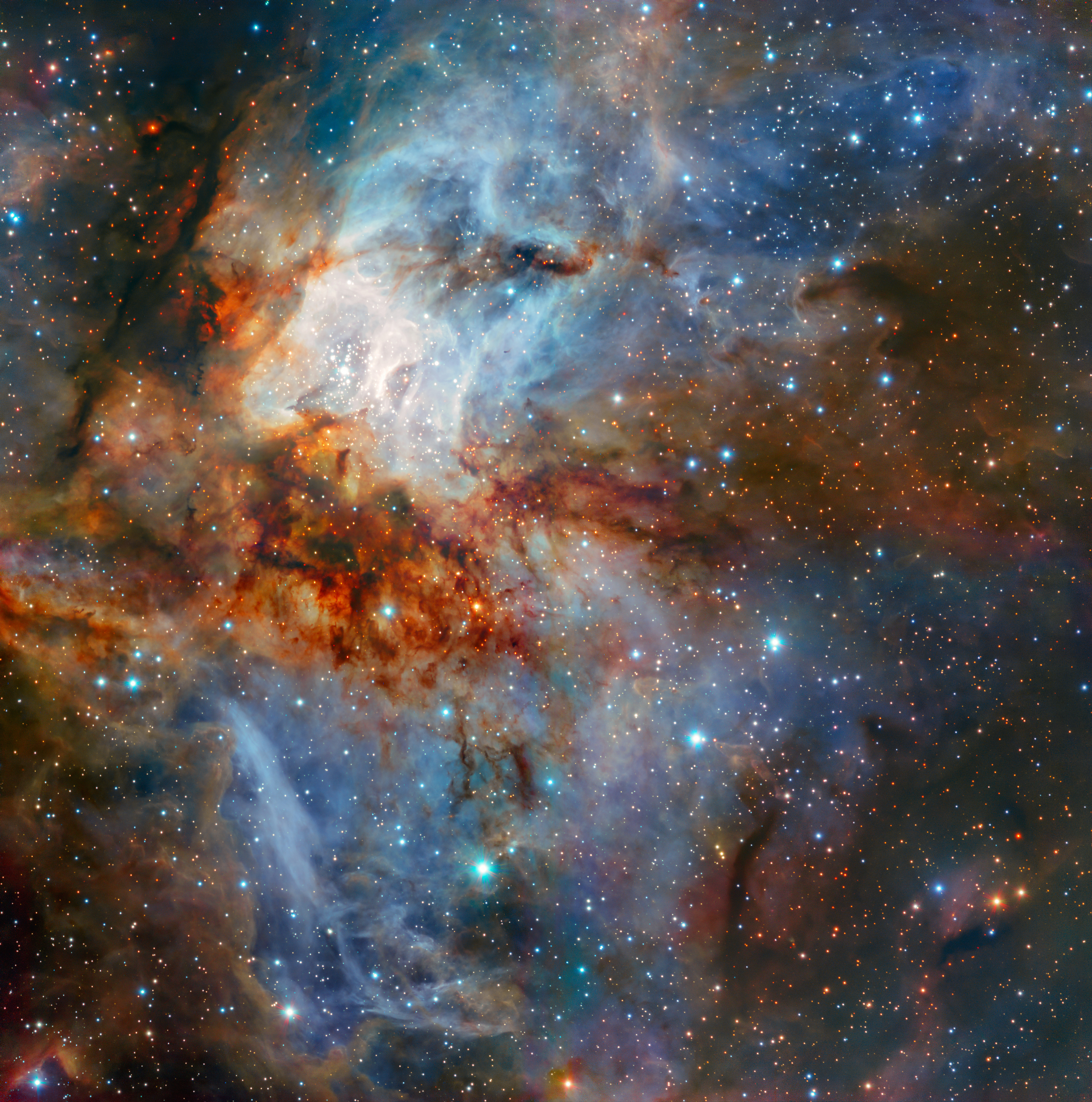
- Nebulosity around the embedded star cluster in RCW 38

Observation data (J2000 epoch)
- Right ascension: 08^{h} 59^{m} 05.52^{s}
- Declination: −47° 30′ 39.2″
- Distance: 5,500 ly (1.7 kpc)

Physical characteristics

Associations
- Constellation: Vela

RCW 38 is a star-forming region in the southern constellation of Vela (known as the Sails). It includes an embedded HII region and a super star cluster. This region is located at a distance of approximately 5,500 light-years from the Sun.

This is the youngest super star cluster in the Milky Way galaxy, with age estimates ranging from 0.1 to 1.0 Myr. It has around 10,000 member stars. The cluster member stars are still enshrouded within the dark cloud in which they were born. The star cluster is surrounded by clouds of brightly glowing gas and includes many protostars. It is therefore classified as an infrared cluster. Observations by the Chandra X-ray Observatory have revealed more than 800 X-ray emitting young stellar objects in the cluster. 139 infrared sources have been identified as variable, of which 47% are candidate young stellar objects. Jets emerging from young protostars drive further star formation in the surrounding cloud.

The cluster includes about 20 massive O-type stars concentrated in a volume a few parsecs across. The latter stars are having a dissipative effect on the surrounding molecular gas. Five bow shocks have been identified coming from these objects, driven by strong stellar winds. When these massive stars die, likely before the dispersal of the cluster, they will explode as supernovae. It is hypothesized that these O-type stars were formed by a collision of two molecular clouds. The primary cloud has a mass of 3×10^{4} M_{☉}, while the secondary cloud has 2×10^{3} M_{☉}.

In the infrared, the brightest star in this region is designated IRS 2. This is a binary star system consisting of two spectral type O5.5 stars. It is located at the heart of the cluster, and appears to lie at the center of the H II region. The second brightest source is a dust ridge designated IRS 1, positioned about 0.1 pc to the west of IRS 2. Both sources are surrounded by a dust-free cavity about 0.1 pc across.

RCW 38 includes Gum 22, Gum 23, and Gum 24.

== Gallery ==
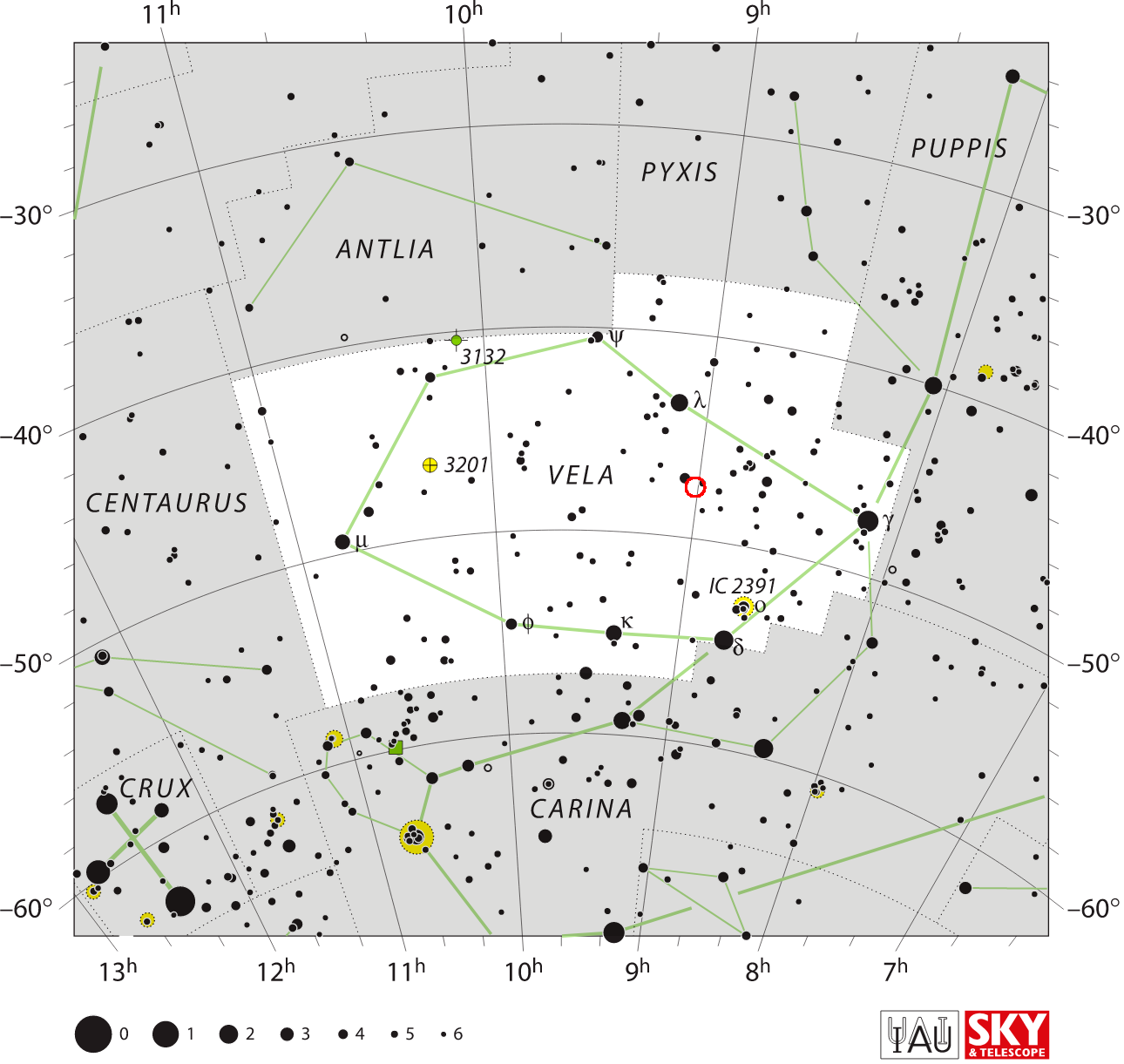
The location of RCW 38 (circled in red)

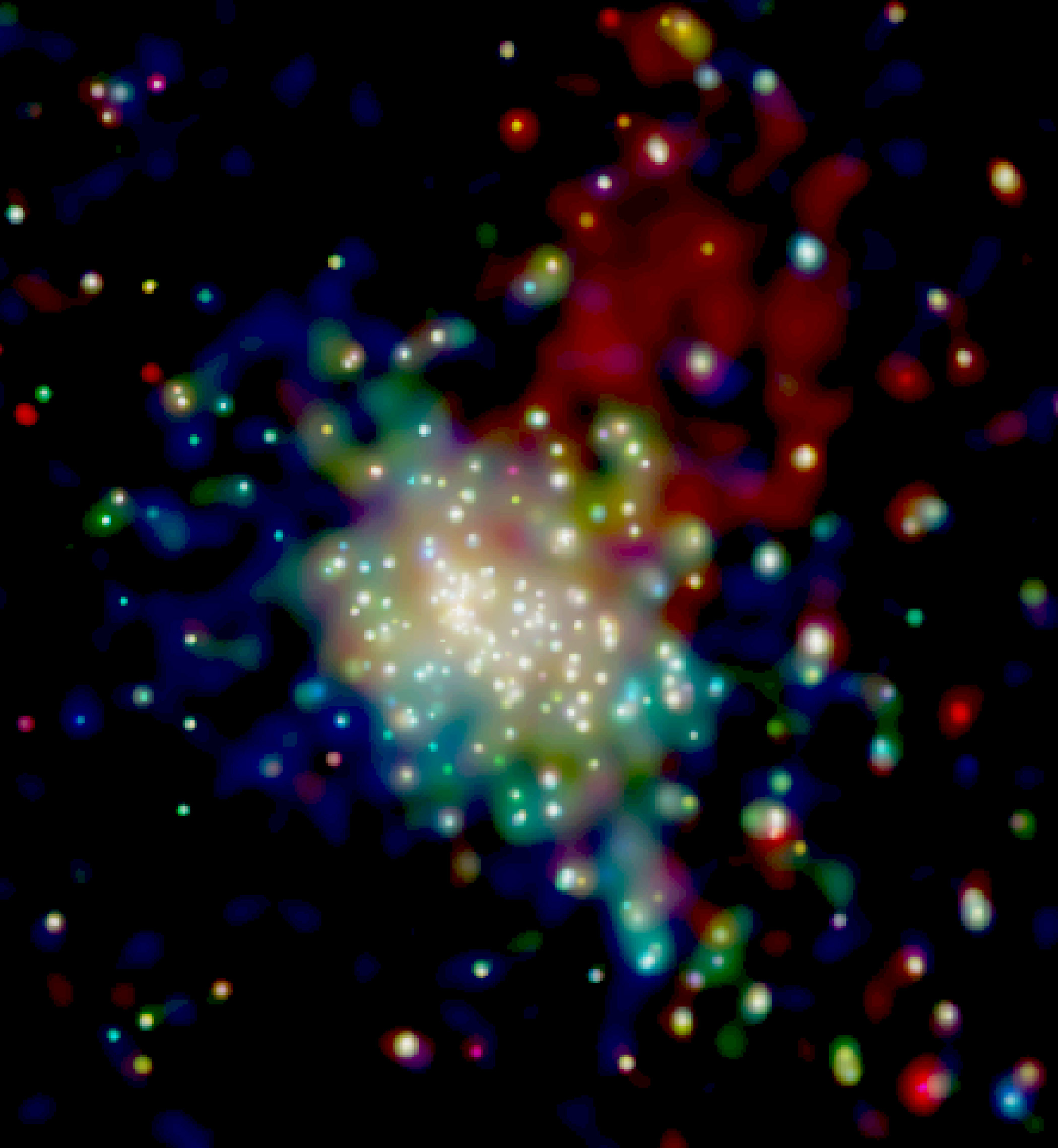
An X-ray view of the dense central star cluster

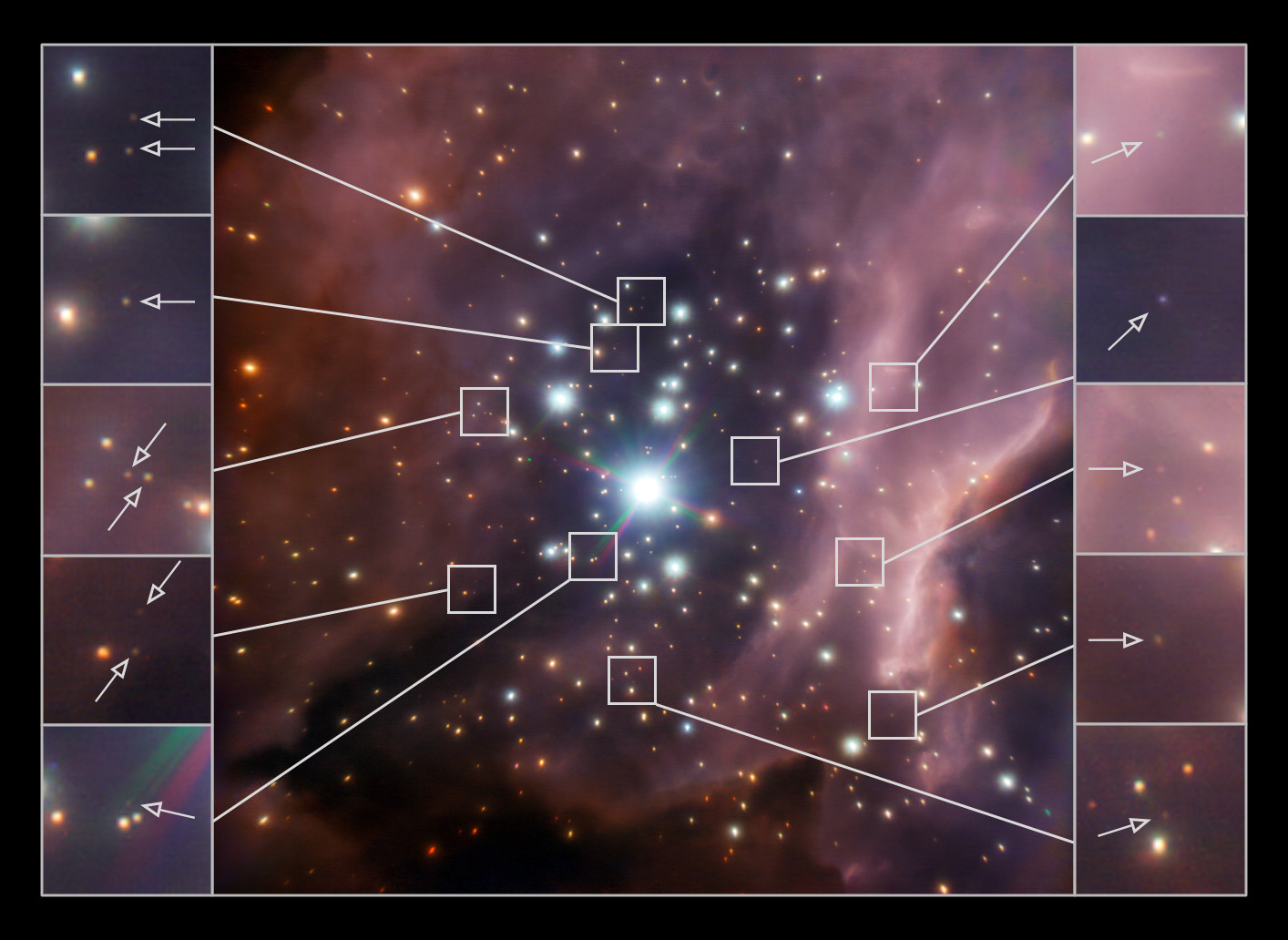
Central part of RCW 38, showing some of the brown dwarf candidates detected within the cluster

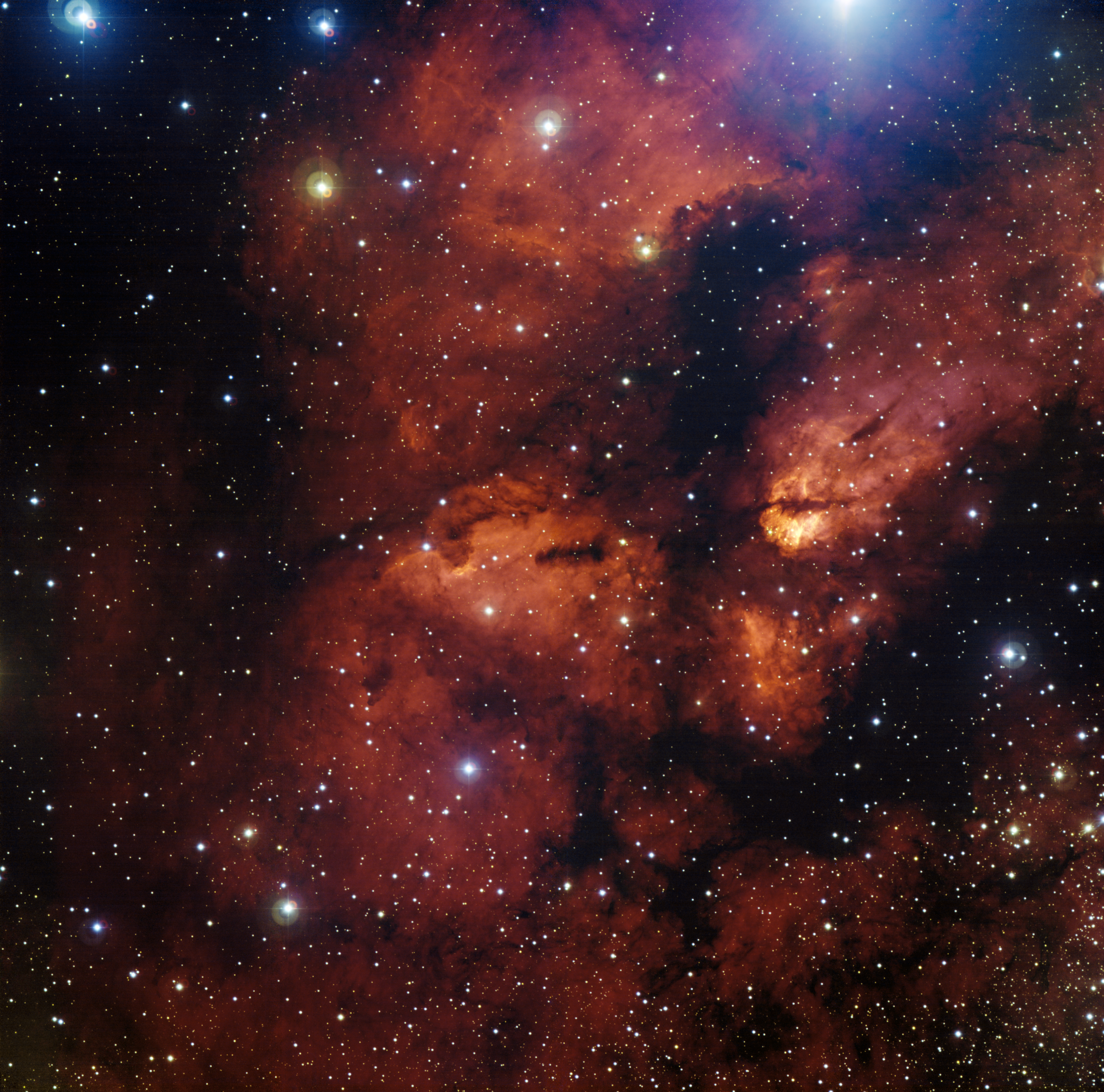
The wider region surrounding RCW 38
