= Sh 2-17 =

Emission nebula

Sharpless 2-17
Emission nebula
- H II region
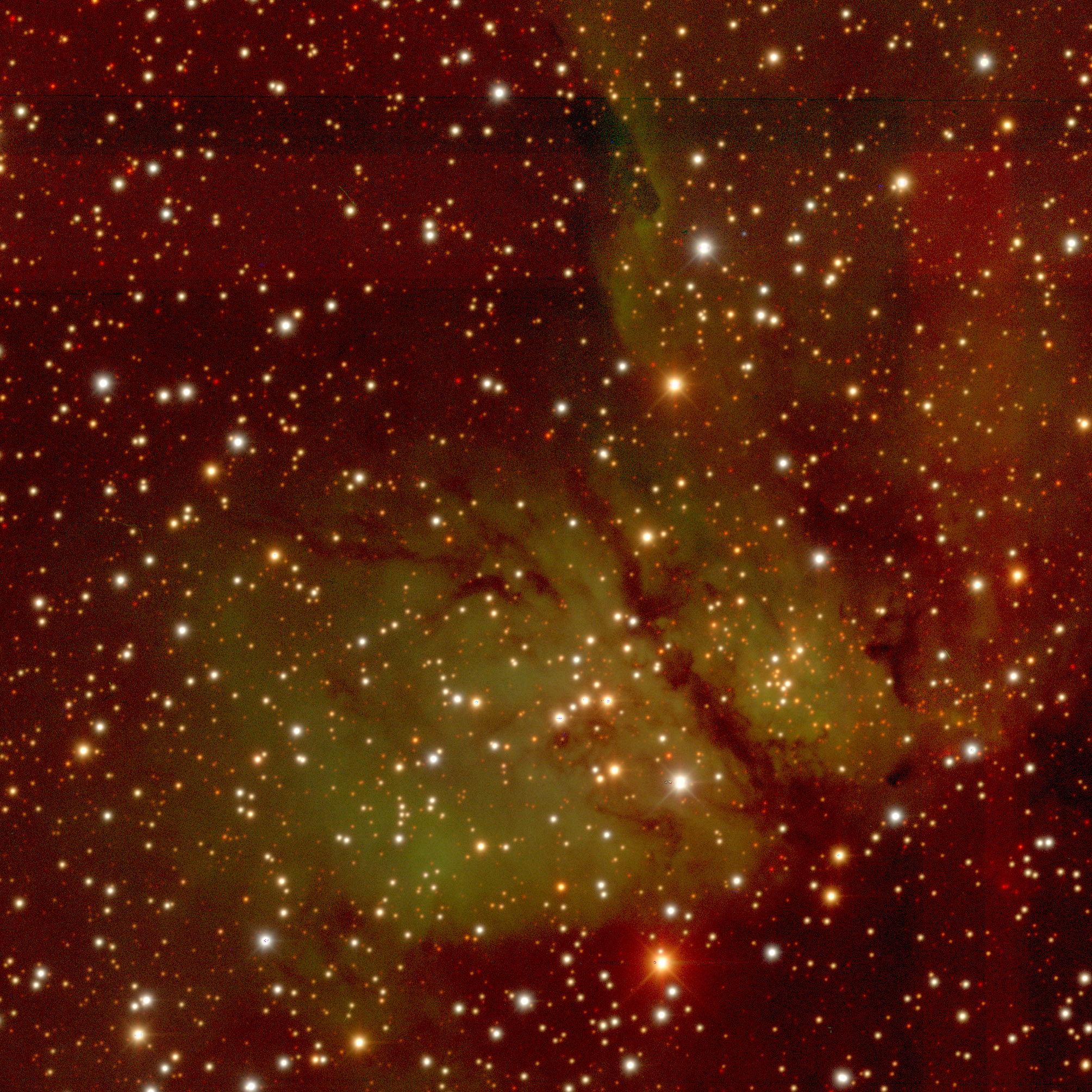
- As seen by the Legacy Survey

Observation data: J2000 epoch
- Right ascension: 17^{h} 46^{m} 12^{s}
- Declination: −28° 51′ 0″
- Distance: 4,890 ly
- Apparent magnitude (V): 15.33
- Apparent diameter: 84' x 63'
- Constellation: Sagittarius

Physical characteristics
- Radius: 36 ly
- Designations: RCW 138

Sh 2-17 is an emission nebula in the constellation Sagittarius. It is part of the Sharpless Catalog assembled by Stewart Sharpless. It contains the infrared cluster [DB2000] 58. It is estimated to contain about 12 stars, and may cause ionization within the nebula.
