= Sh 2-16 =

Emission nebula

Sharpless 2-16
Nebula
- H II region
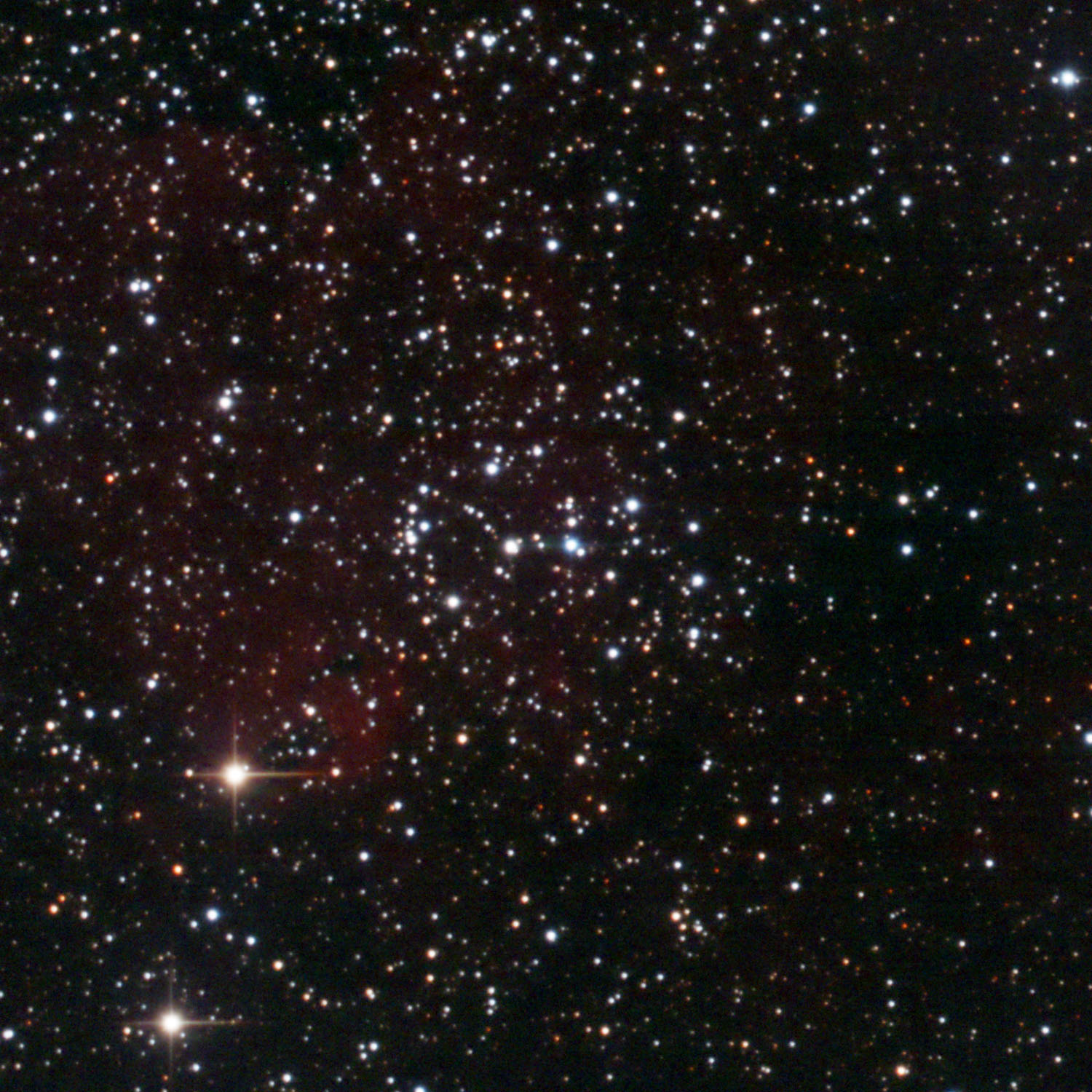
- Sh 2-16 seen faintly behind Collinder 347

Observation data: epoch
- Right ascension: 17^{h} 46^{m} 37.2^{s}
- Declination: −29° 22′ 02″
- Distance: 1550±150 pc
- Apparent magnitude (V): 15.23
- Apparent diameter: 12'
- Constellation: Sagittarius

Physical characteristics
- Radius: 28 ly
- Designations: RCW 137, Gum 70, LBN 1124

Sh 2-16 is an emission nebula in the constellation Sagittarius. It is ionized by the star LSS 4381. The nebula also contains an infrared cluster, [DB2000] 56. It is at the same location as open cluster Collinder 347 which is located closer than the nebula.

The region appears mostly red in visible light, making observation best through a Hydrogen-alpha filter.
