= Eagle Nebula =

Open cluster in the constellation Serpens

Emission nebula
- H II region

Observation data: J2000.0 epoch
- Right ascension: 18^{h} 18^{m} 45.1^{s} ICRS
- Declination: −13° 47′ 13″ ICRS
- Distance: 5,700±400 ly (1,740±130 pc)
- Apparent magnitude (V): 6.4
- Apparent dimensions (V): 70 x 50 arcmins
- Constellation: Serpens

Physical characteristics
- Radius: 70×55 (cluster 15) ly
- Absolute magnitude (V): -8.21
- Notable features: 1–2 million years old
- Designations: Messier 16, NGC 6611, Sharpless 49, RCW 165, Cr 375, Gum 83, Star Queen Nebula

The Eagle Nebula is a young open cluster of stars in the constellation of Serpens. Alternatively, it is catalogued as Messier 16, M16, or NGC 6611, and sometimes referred to as the Star Queen Nebula. This cluster was discovered by Jean-Philippe de Cheseaux in 1745–46. Both the "Eagle" and the "Star Queen" refer to visual impressions of the dark silhouette near the center of the nebula, an area made famous as the "Pillars of Creation" imaged by the Hubble Space Telescope. The nebula contains several active star-forming gas and dust regions, including the aforementioned Pillars of Creation. The Eagle Nebula lies in the Sagittarius Arm of the Milky Way.

== Characteristics ==
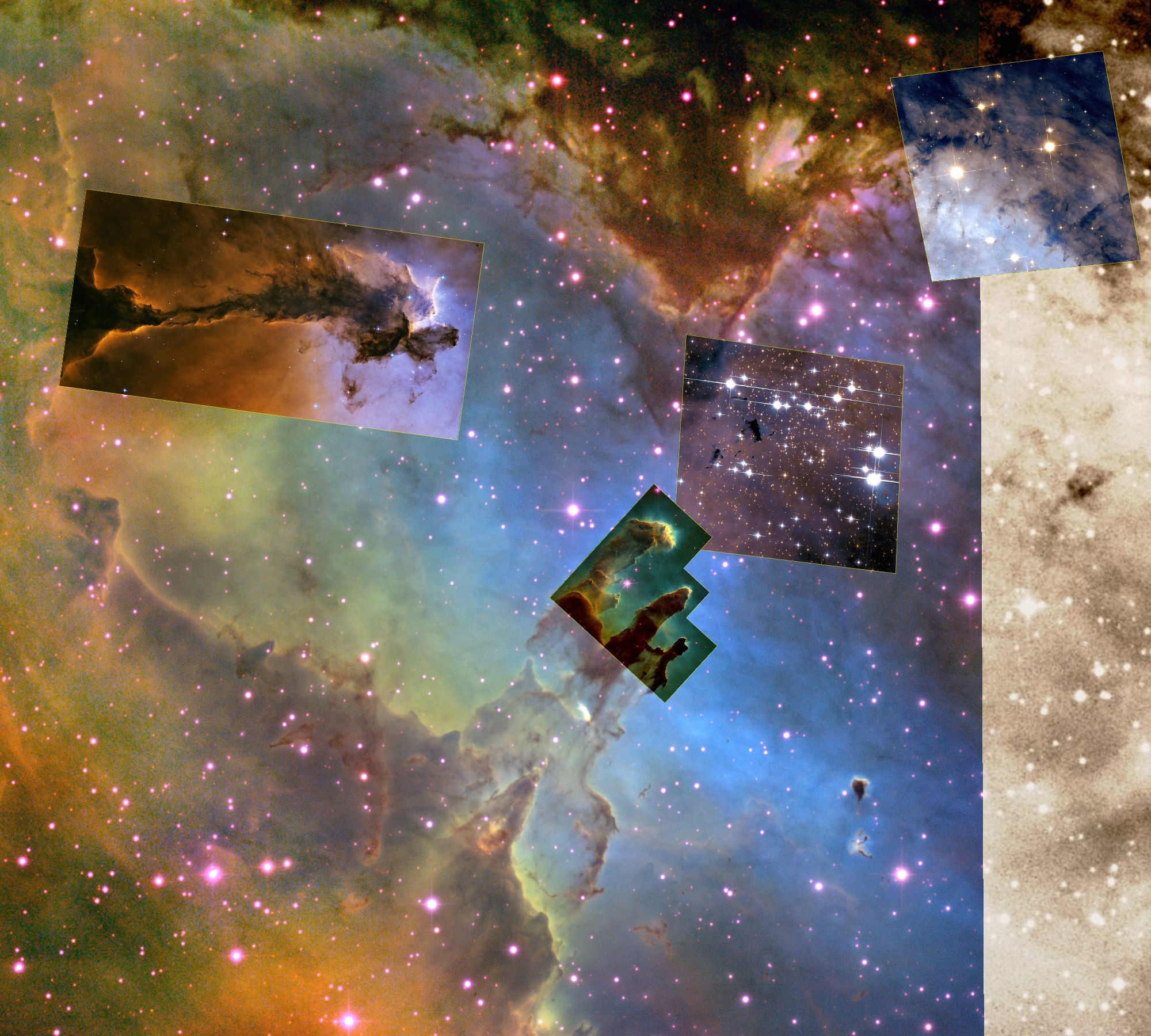
Locator of well-known areas in the nebula

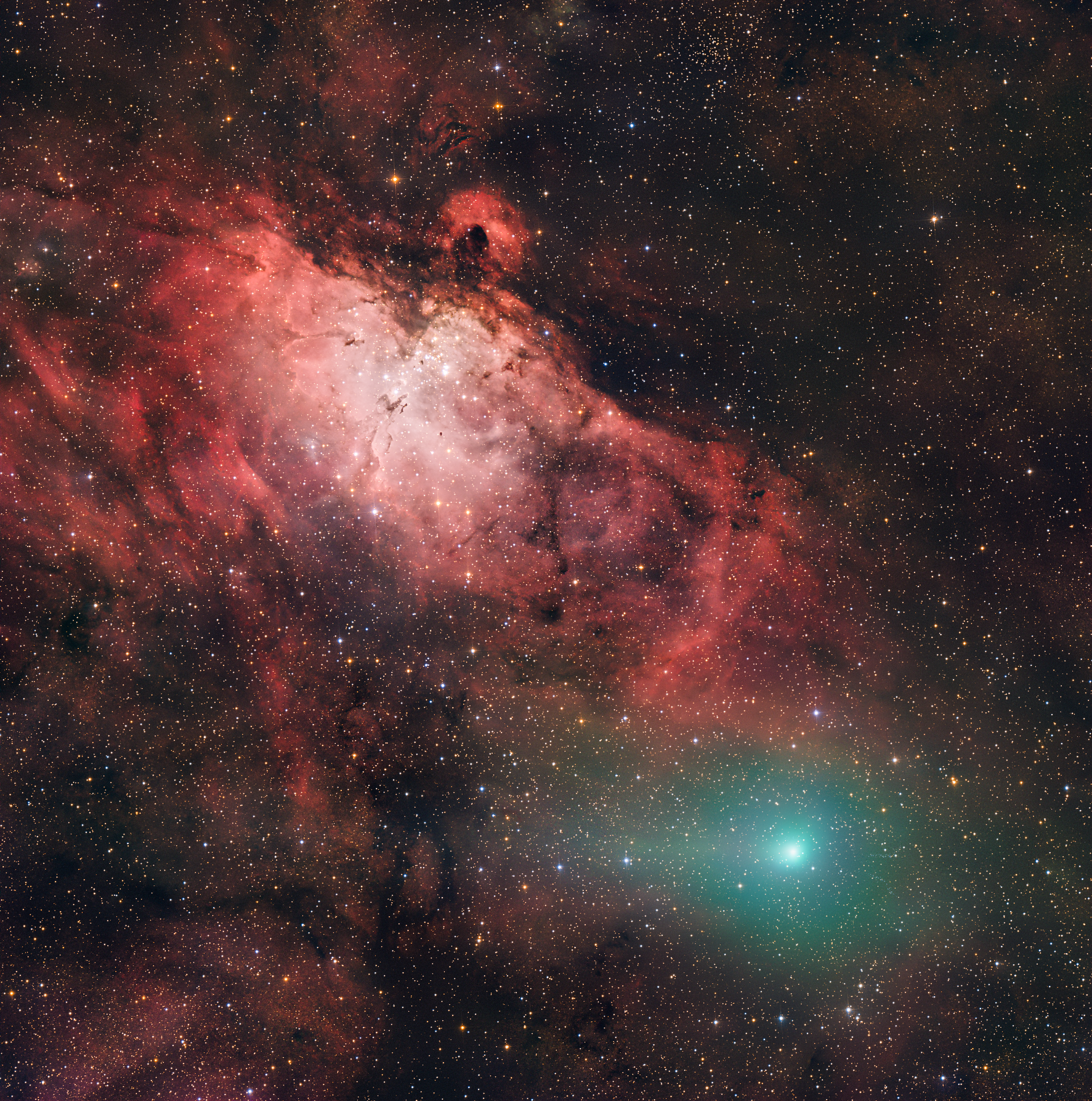
Emission nebula (IC 4703) and comet C/2025 R2 (SWAN) as it exits the inner solar system in October 2025

The Eagle Nebula is a diffuse emission nebula, or H II region, which is catalogued as IC 4703. This region of active current star formation is about 5700 light-years distant. A spire of gas that can be seen coming off the nebula in the northeastern part is approximately 9.5 light-years or about 90 trillion kilometers long.

The cluster associated with the nebula has approximately 8100 stars, which are mostly concentrated in a gap in the molecular cloud to the north-west of the Pillars. The brightest star (HD 168076) has an apparent magnitude of +8.24, easily visible with good binoculars. It is actually a binary star formed of an O3.5V star plus an O7.5V companion. This star has a mass of roughly 80 solar masses, and a luminosity up to 1 million times that of the Sun. The cluster's age has been estimated to be 1–2 million years.

The descriptive names reflect impressions of the shape of the central pillar rising from the southeast into the central luminous area. The name "Star Queen Nebula" was introduced by Robert Burnham Jr., reflecting his characterization of the central pillar as the Star Queen shown in silhouette.

== "Pillars of Creation" region ==
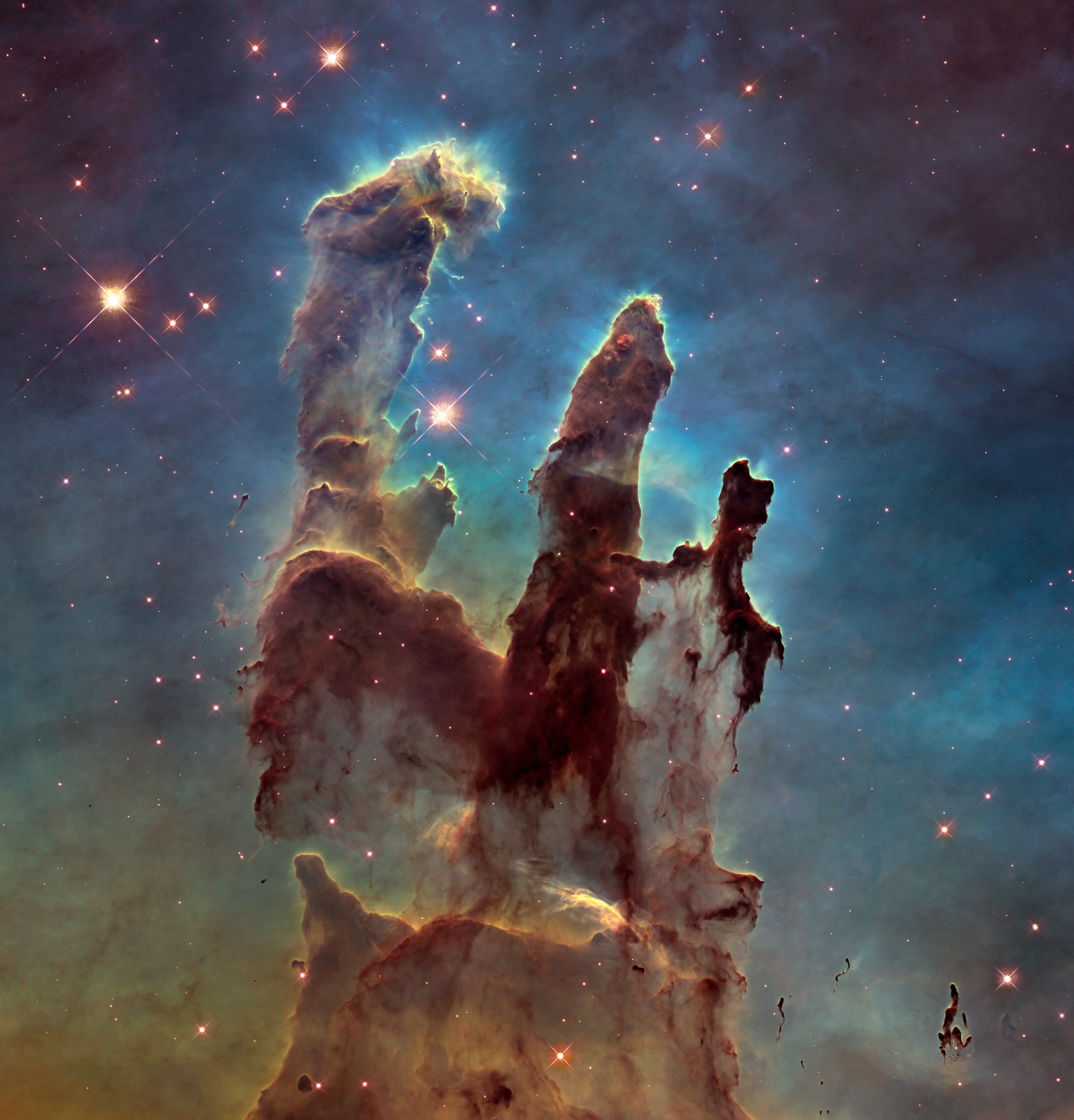
Pillars of creation

Images produced by Jeff Hester and Paul Scowen using the Hubble Space Telescope in 1995 greatly improved scientific understanding of processes inside the nebula. One of these became famous as the "Pillars of Creation", depicting a large region of star formation. Its small dark pockets are believed to be protostars (Bok globules). The pillar structure resembles that of a much larger instance in the Soul Nebula of Cassiopeia, imaged with the Spitzer Space Telescope in 2005 equally characterized as "Pillars of Star Creation". or "Pillars of Star Formation". These columns – which resemble stalagmites protruding from the floor of a cavern – are composed of interstellar hydrogen gas and dust, which act as incubators for new stars. Inside the columns and on their surface astronomers have found knots or globules of denser gas, called EGGs ("Evaporating Gaseous Globules"). Stars are being formed inside some of these.

X-ray images from the Chandra Observatory compared with Hubble's "Pillars" image have shown that X-ray sources (from young stars) do not coincide with the pillars, but rather randomly dot the nebula. Any protostars in the pillars' EGGs are not yet hot enough to emit X-rays.

=== Possible annihilation via supernova ===
Evidence from the Spitzer Space Telescope originally suggested that the pillars in M16 may be threatened by a "past supernova". Hot gas observed by Spitzer in 2007 suggested they were already – likely – being disturbed by a supernova that exploded 8,000 to 9,000 years ago. Due to the distance the main blast of light would have reached Earth for a brief time 1,000 to 2,000 years ago. A more slowly moving, theorized, shock wave would have taken a few thousand years to move through the nebula and would have blown away the delicate pillars. However, in 2014 the pillars were imaged a second time by Hubble, in both visible light and infrared light. The images being 20 years later provided a new, detailed account of the rate of evaporation occurring within the pillars. No supernova is evidenced within them, and it is estimated in some form they still exist – and will appear for at least 100,000 more years.

== See also ==
- List of Messier objects
- NGC 1193
