= Rosette Nebula =

Emission nebula in the constellation Monoceros

Emission nebula
- H II region
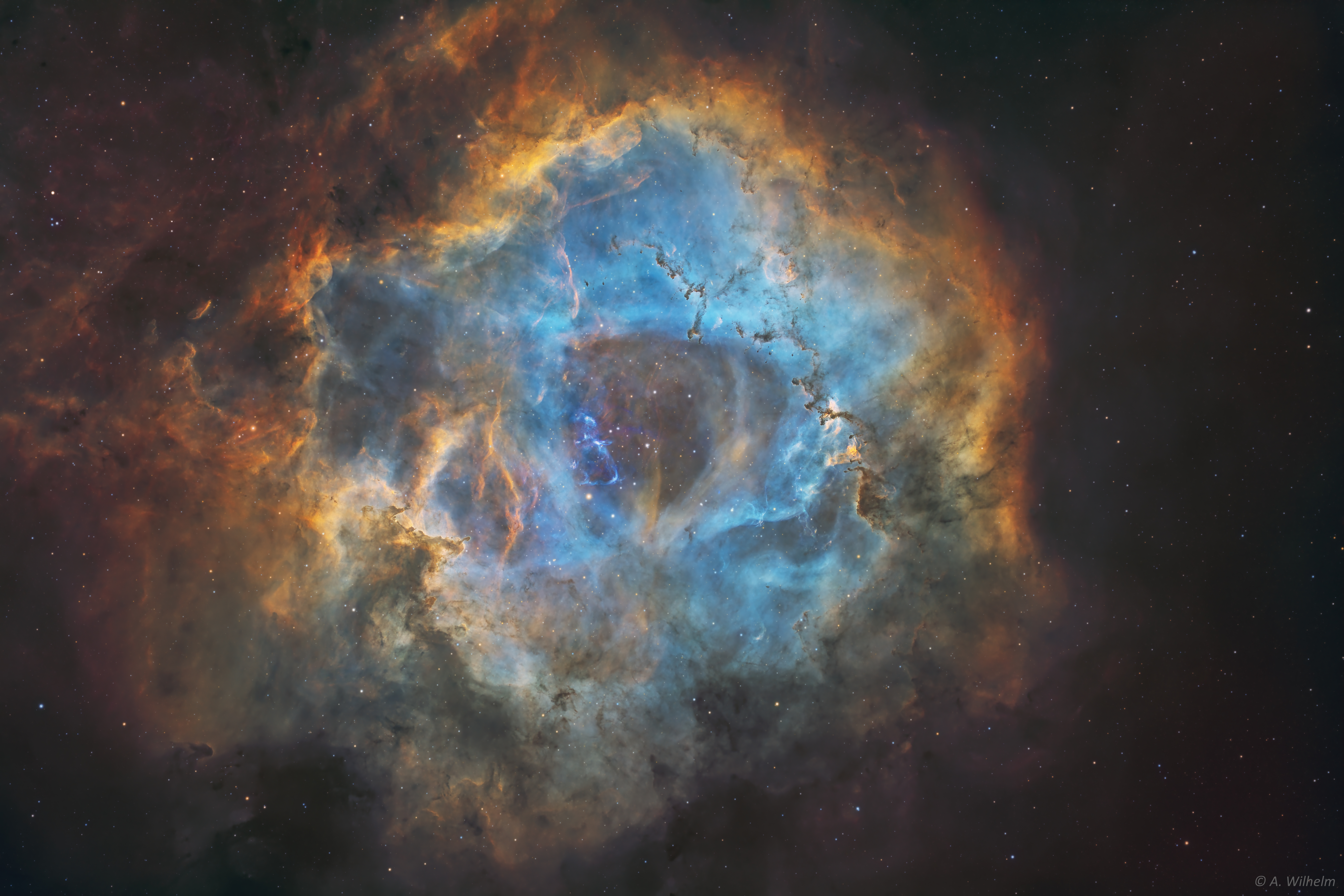
- Rosette Nebula in narrowband with Hubble pallette

Observation data: J2000.0 epoch
- Right ascension: 06^{h} 33^{m} 45^{s}
- Declination: +04° 59′ 54″
- Distance: 5,200 ly (1,600 pc)
- Apparent magnitude (V): 9.0
- Apparent dimensions (V): 1.3 °
- Constellation: Monoceros

Physical characteristics
- Radius: 65 ly
- Notable features: Multipart nebula
- Designations: SH 2-275, CTB 21, Caldwell 49

The Rosette Nebula (also known as Caldwell 49) is an H II region located near one end of the Rosette Molecular Cloud in the Monoceros region of the Milky Way Galaxy. The open cluster NGC 2244 (Caldwell 50) is closely associated with the nebulosity, the stars of the cluster having been formed from the nebula's matter.

The nebula has a shape reminiscent of a human skull, and is sometimes referred to as the "Skull Nebula". It is not to be confused with NGC 246, which is also nicknamed the "Skull Nebula".

The Little Rosette Nebula, or Sharpless 2-170, is a less known nebula named for the Rosette Nebula.

== Description ==
The complex has the following New General Catalogue (NGC) designations:

- NGC 2237 – Part of the nebulous region (Also used to denote whole nebula)
- NGC 2238 – Part of the nebulous region
- NGC 2239 – Part of the nebulous region (Discovered by John Herschel)
- NGC 2244 – The open cluster within the nebula (Discovered by John Flamsteed in 1690)
- NGC 2246 – Part of the nebulous region

The cluster and nebula lie at a distance of 5,000 light-years from Earth and measure roughly 130 light years in diameter. The radiation from the young stars excites the atoms in the nebula, causing them to emit radiation themselves producing the emission nebula seen from Earth. The mass of the nebula is estimated to be around 10,000 solar masses.

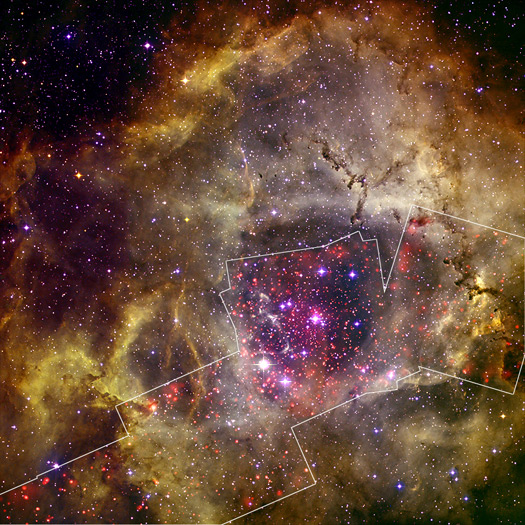
Chandra X-ray image overlaying an optical image reveals hundreds of young stars (red points inside the boxes).

A survey of the nebula with the Chandra X-ray Observatory has revealed the presence of numerous new-born stars inside optical Rosette Nebula and studded within the Rosette Molecular Cloud. Altogether, approximately 2500 young stars lie in this star-forming complex, including the massive O-type stars HD 46223 and HD 46150, which are primarily responsible for blowing the ionized bubble. Most of the ongoing star-formation activity is occurring in the Rosette Molecular Cloud to the south east of the bubble. The nebula contains nine known infrared clusters.

A diffuse X-ray glow is also seen between the stars in the bubble, which has been attributed to a super-hot plasma with temperatures ranging from 1 to 10 million K. This is significantly hotter than the 10,000 K plasmas seen in HII regions, and is likely attributed to the shock-heated winds from the massive O-type stars.

On April 16, 2019, the Oklahoma Legislature passed HB1292 making the Rosette Nebula as the official state astronomical object. Oklahoma Governor Kevin Stitt signed it into law April 22, 2019.

== See also ==
- List of largest nebulae
- Lists of astronomical objects
- Little Rosette Nebula
