= RCW Catalogue =

1960s astronomical catalogue

- Named after: Rodgers, Campbell & Whiteoak
- Related media on Commons

The RCW Catalogue (from Rodgers, Campbell & Whiteoak) is an astronomical catalogue of Hα-emission regions in the southern Milky Way, described in (Rodgers et al. 1960). It contains 182 objects, including many of the earlier Gum catalogue (84 items) objects.

The later Caldwell catalogue included some objects from the RCW catalogue. There is also some overlap with the Sharpless catalogue-2 (312 items), although that primarily covered the northern hemisphere, whereas RCW and Gum primarily covered the southern hemisphere.

The RCW catalogue was compiled by Alexander William Rodgers, Colin T. Campbell and John Bartlett Whiteoak. They catalogued southern nebulae while working under Bart Bok at the Mount Stromlo Observatory in Australia in the 1960s.

== Examples ==
RCW	Name	Images	Names & Designations
RCW 1a	Sh 2-297		Sh2-297, LBN 1039, Ced 90,
RCW 11	RCW 11		Sh2-308, LBN 1052
RCW 16	NGC 2467		
RCW 34	RCW 34		Gum 19
RCW 36	RCW 36		Gum 20
RCW 42	RCW 42		Gum 26
RCW 38	RCW 38		RCW 38
RCW 49	RCW 49		Gum 29
RCW 57	RCW 57		NGC 3582, The Torchbearer
RCW 75	Stock 16		Gum 48a, Stock 16
RCW 79	RCW 79		RCW 79
RCW 86	RCW 86		RCW 86
RCW 88	RCW 88		RCW 88
RCW 106	RCW 106		
RCW 108	RCW 108		Gum 53
RCW 124	NGC 6302		Sh2-6, NGC 6302, Bug Nebula, PK 349+01 1, Butterfly Nebula, RCW 124, Gum 60, Caldwell 69
RCW 127	NGC 6334		ESO 392-EN 009, Sharpless 8, RCW 127, Gum 64, NGC 6334
RCW 131	NGC 6357		Sh2-11, NGC 6357, RCW 131, Gum 66, War and Peace Nebula
RCW 146	Lagoon Nebula		Sh2 25, RCW 146, Gum 72
RCW 147	Trifid Nebula		Sh2 30, M20, NGC 6514, RCW 147, Gum 76
RCW 160	Omega Nebula		Omega Nebula, M17, NGC 6618, Swan Nebula, Sharpless 45, RCW 160, Gum 81
RCW 165	Eagle Nebula		Sh2-49, Messier 16, NGC 6611, RCW 165, Gum 83
RCW 174	W 40		Sh2-64

== List ==
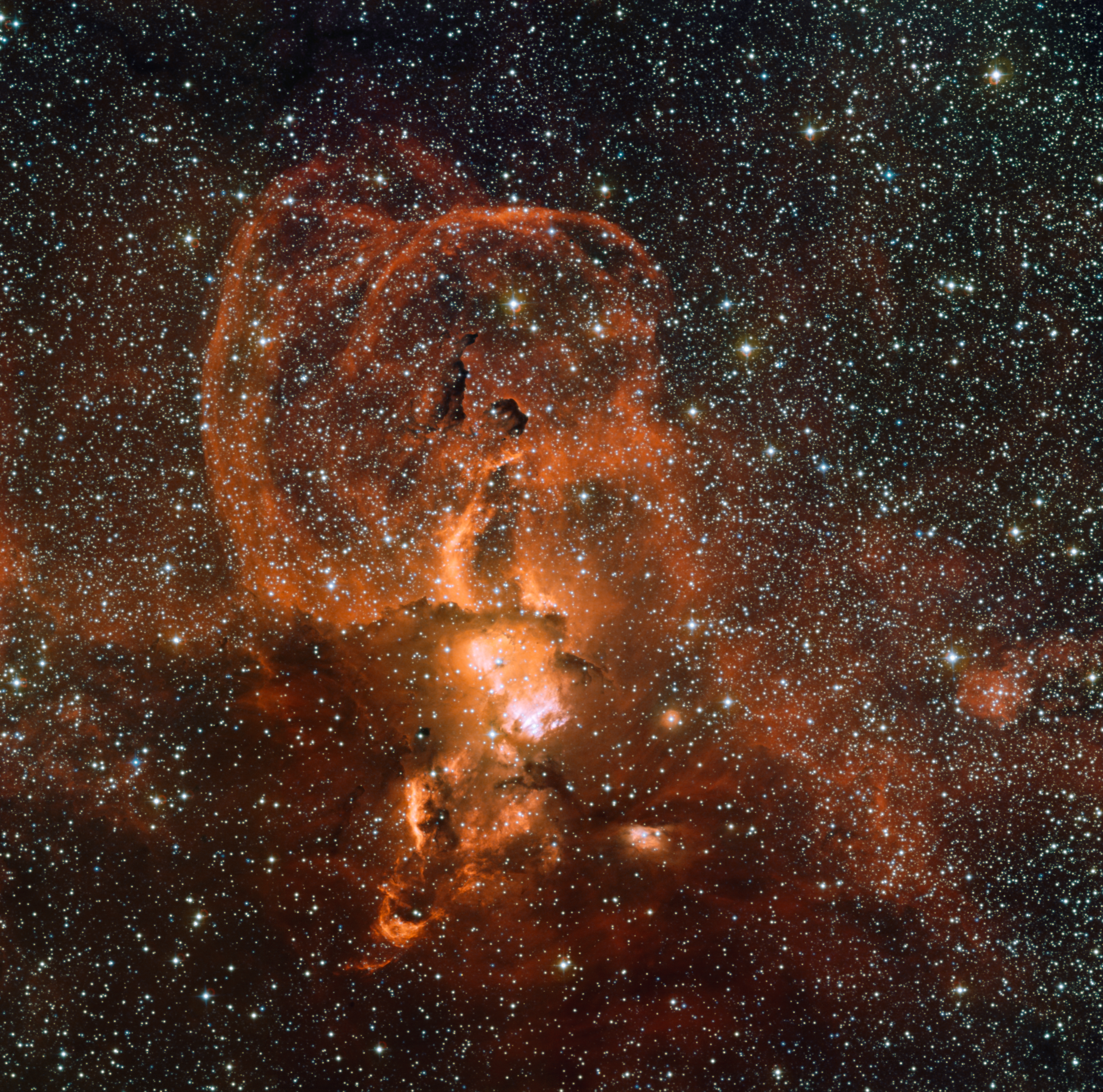
NGC 3582, part of RCW 57, a large star-forming region in the Milky Way

- RCW 1
- RCW 2
- RCW 3
- RCW 4
- RCW 5
- RCW 6
- RCW 7
- RCW 8
- RCW 9
- RCW 10
- RCW 11
- RCW 12
- RCW 13
- RCW 14
- RCW 15
- RCW 16
- RCW 17
- RCW 18
- RCW 19
- RCW 20
- RCW 21
- RCW 22
- RCW 23
- RCW 24
- RCW 25
- RCW 26
- RCW 27
- RCW 28
- RCW 29
- RCW 30
- RCW 31
- RCW 32
- RCW 33
- RCW 34
- RCW 35
- RCW 36
- RCW 37
- RCW 38
- RCW 39
- RCW 40
- RCW 41
- RCW 42
- RCW 43
- RCW 44
- RCW 45
- RCW 46
- RCW 47
- RCW 48
- RCW 49
- RCW 50
- RCW 51
- RCW 52
- RCW 53
- RCW 54
- RCW 55
- RCW 56
- RCW 57
- RCW 58
- RCW 59
- RCW 60
- RCW 61
- RCW 62
- RCW 63
- RCW 64
- RCW 65
- RCW 66
- RCW 67
- RCW 68
- RCW 69
- RCW 70
- RCW 71
- RCW 72
- RCW 73
- RCW 74
- RCW 75
- RCW 76
- RCW 77
- RCW 78
- RCW 79
- RCW 80
- RCW 81
- RCW 82
- RCW 83
- RCW 84
- RCW 85
- RCW 86
- RCW 87
- RCW 88
- RCW 89
- RCW 90
- RCW 91
- RCW 92
- RCW 93
- RCW 94
- RCW 95
- RCW 96
- RCW 97
- RCW 98
- RCW 99
- RCW 100
- RCW 101
- RCW 102
- RCW 103
- RCW 104
- RCW 105
- RCW 106
- RCW 107
- RCW 108
- RCW 109
- RCW 110
- RCW 111
- RCW 112
- RCW 113
- RCW 114
- RCW 115
- RCW 116
- RCW 117
- RCW 118
- RCW 119
- RCW 120
- RCW 121
- RCW 122
- RCW 123
- RCW 124
- RCW 125
- RCW 126
- RCW 127
- RCW 128
- RCW 129
- RCW 130
- RCW 131
- RCW 132
- RCW 133
- RCW 134
- RCW 135
- RCW 136
- RCW 137
- RCW 138
- RCW 139
- RCW 140
- RCW 141
- RCW 142
- RCW 143
- RCW 144
- RCW 145
- RCW 146
- RCW 147
- RCW 148
- RCW 149
- RCW 150
- RCW 151
- RCW 152
- RCW 153
- RCW 154
- RCW 155
- RCW 156
- RCW 157
- RCW 158
- RCW 159
- RCW 160
- RCW 161
- RCW 162
- RCW 163
- RCW 164
- RCW 165
- RCW 166
- RCW 167
- RCW 168
- RCW 169
- RCW 170
- RCW 171
- RCW 172
- RCW 173
- RCW 174
- RCW 175
- RCW 176
- RCW 177
- RCW 178
- RCW 179
- RCW 180
- RCW 181
- RCW 182

== Star chart ==
Chart of RCW and Gum HII regions

== See also ==
- Sharpless catalog
- Gum Catalog
- Caldwell catalogue
- List of Star-Forming Regions in the Local Group
