= List of star-forming regions in the Local Group =

Regions in the Milky Way galaxy and Local Group where new stars are forming

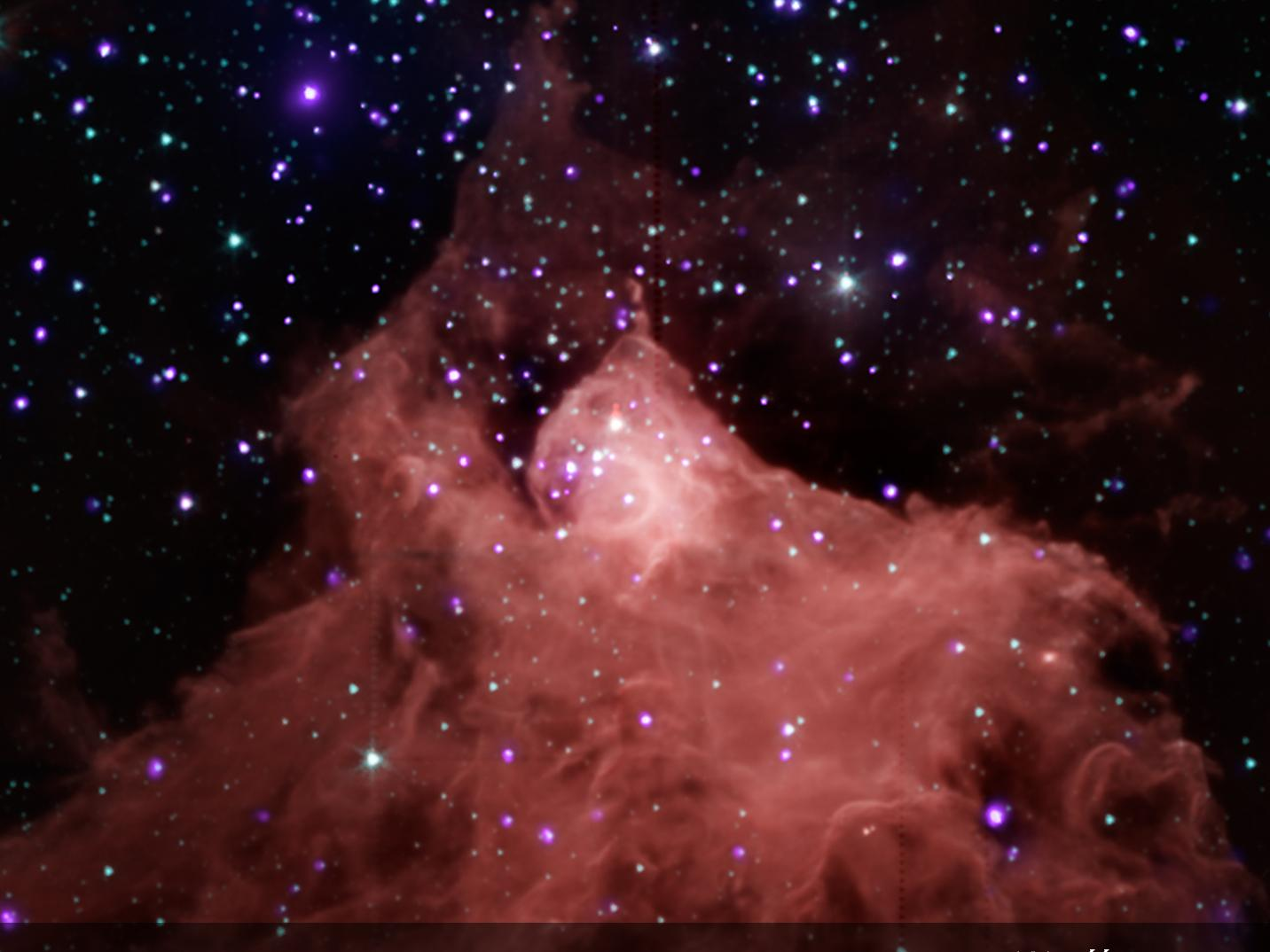
Composite image showing young stars in and around molecular cloud Cepheus B

This is a list of star-forming regions in the Milky Way Galaxy and the Local Group. Star formation occurs in molecular clouds, which become unstable to gravitational collapse, and these complexes may contain clusters of young stars and regions of ionized gas called H II regions. Stars typically form in groups of many stars, rather than in isolation.

== Galactic star-forming regions ==
Name	RA [deg]	Dec [deg]	l [deg]	b [deg]	Distance [pc]	Age [Myr]	Earliest SpTy	Number of Stars	Cloud Mass [Mo]
Corona Australis Molecular Cloud	287.368	-37.904			130				
Rho Oph	247.025	-24.541	353.22	16.53	131				
Taurus Molecular Cloud	070.25	+25.87	174.13	-13.45	140				
Orion Nebula	83.8221	-5.3911	209.013	-19.382	415				
W40	277.871	-2.090	28.791	+3.481	500	0.8	late-O	520	
RCW 36	134.7537	-43.0	265.0794	+1.4048	700				
Vela Molecular Ridge	134.7537	-43.0	265.0794	+1.4048	700-1000				
Cygnus X	307.5	41.0			1400				
NGC 6334	260.212	-36.115	351.42	+0.64	1700				
NGC 6357	261.62	-34.20	353.11	+0.65	1700				
Eagle Nebula	274.700	-13.807	16.95	+0.793	1750				
M17	275.196	-16.172	15.06	-0.69	2000				
Carina Nebula	161.285	-59.868			2600				
AFGL 2591	307.354	40.189	078.887	+0.709	3300		O9–O6		
W43	281.885	-01.942	30.759	-0.019	6000				
W49	287.582	+9.128	43.200	+0.000	11000		O2-3.5If*		
Radcliffe wave									

== Extragalactic star-forming regions ==
Name	RA [deg]	Dec [deg]	l [deg]	b [deg]	Distance [pc]	Age [Myr]	Earliest SpTy	Number of Stars	Cloud Mass [Mo]
30 Doradus	84.67665	-69.10093	279.4652	-31.6719	49,000				

== See also ==
- RCW Catalog – 1960s astronomical catalogue
- Sharpless catalog – Made of a list
- Gum catalog – Astronomical catalog of nebulae
- List of nearest stars and brown dwarfs
