= Infrared compact catalogue =

Astronomical reference list

In astronomy, infrared compact or IRc designations refer to objects in several astronomical catalogues. The first is a list of near-infrared sources in the NGC 6334 molecular cloud. There are also a series of infrared catalogues of objects in Orion.
