= Sh 2-19 =

Emission nebula

Sharpless 2-19
Emission nebula
- H II region

Observation data: J2000 epoch
- Right ascension: 17^{h} 49^{m} 24^{s}
- Declination: −29° 46′ 13″
- Distance: 4,890 ly (1500 pc)
- Apparent dimensions (V): 12'
- Constellation: Sagittarius

Physical characteristics
- Radius: 17 ly
- Designations: RCW 140, LBN 2

Sh 2-19 is an emission nebula in the constellation Sagittarius. It is part of the Sharpless Catalog assembled by Stewart Sharpless. It lies next to Sh 2-18. It contains the open cluster Ruprecht 131.

Ruprecht 131 appears smaller than the nebula, with an apparent size of only 7' compared to the nebula's 12'.
