= Sh 2-35 =

Molecular cloud

Sharpless 2-35
Nebula
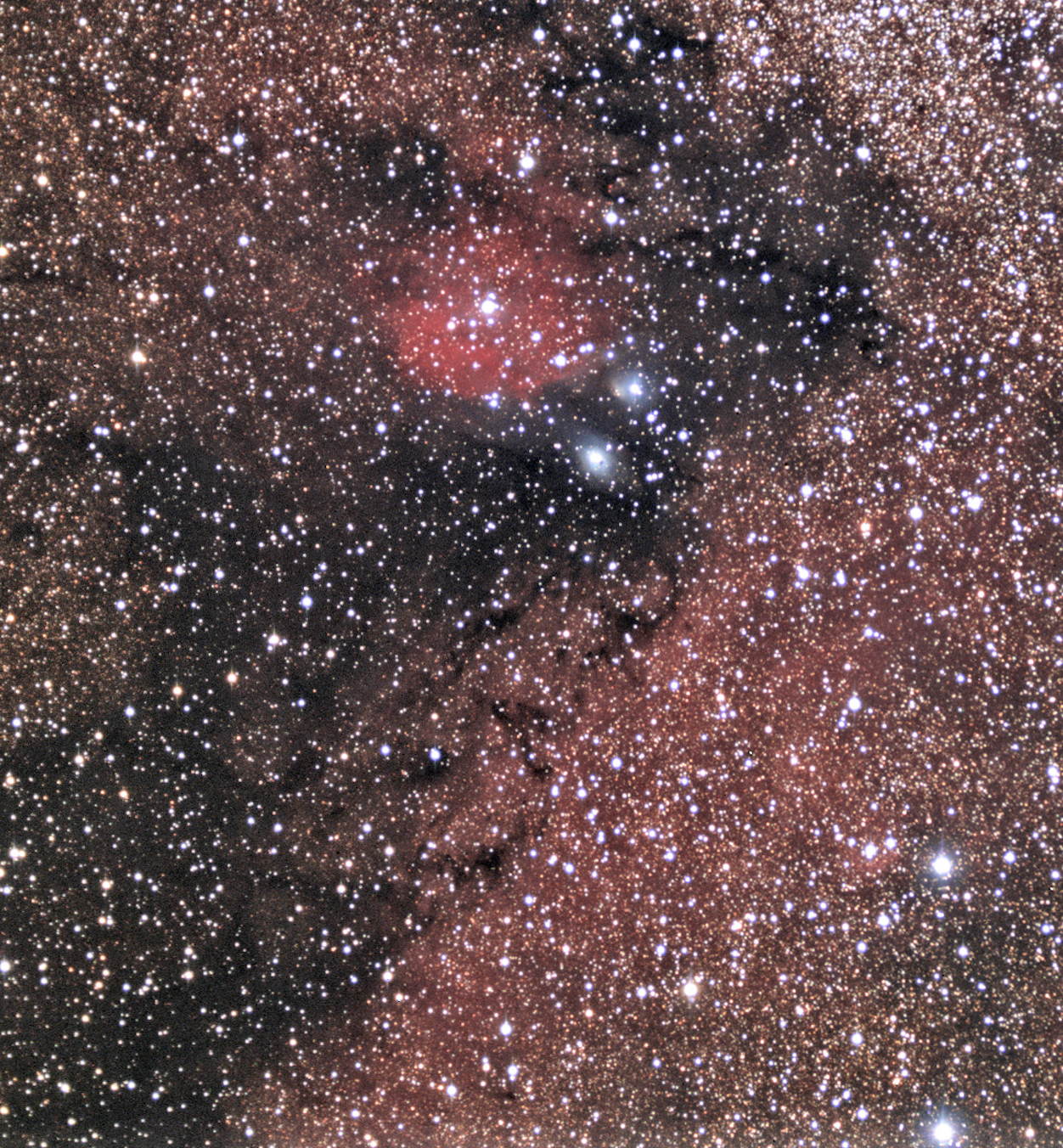
- Sh 2-35, the large red region. Sh 2-37 is the small red region near the top.

Observation data: J2000 epoch
- Right ascension: 18^{h} 15^{m} 54^{s}
- Declination: −20° 15′ 00″
- Distance: 5870 ly
- Apparent magnitude (V): 15.45
- Apparent dimensions (V): 20'
- Constellation: Sagittarius
- Designations: Gum 77b, RCW 151, LBN 010.91-01.70, LBN 42

Sh 2-35 is a nebula in Sagittarius. It is best viewed with a Hydrogen-alpha filter. It is located near to Sh 2-37. combined with Sh 2-37, it has a mass of 130 thousand solar masses.

As Gum 77b, it is grouped together with Sh 2-34, despite the two objects having no relation.
