= RCW 79 =

Nebula in the constellation Centaurus

Emission nebula
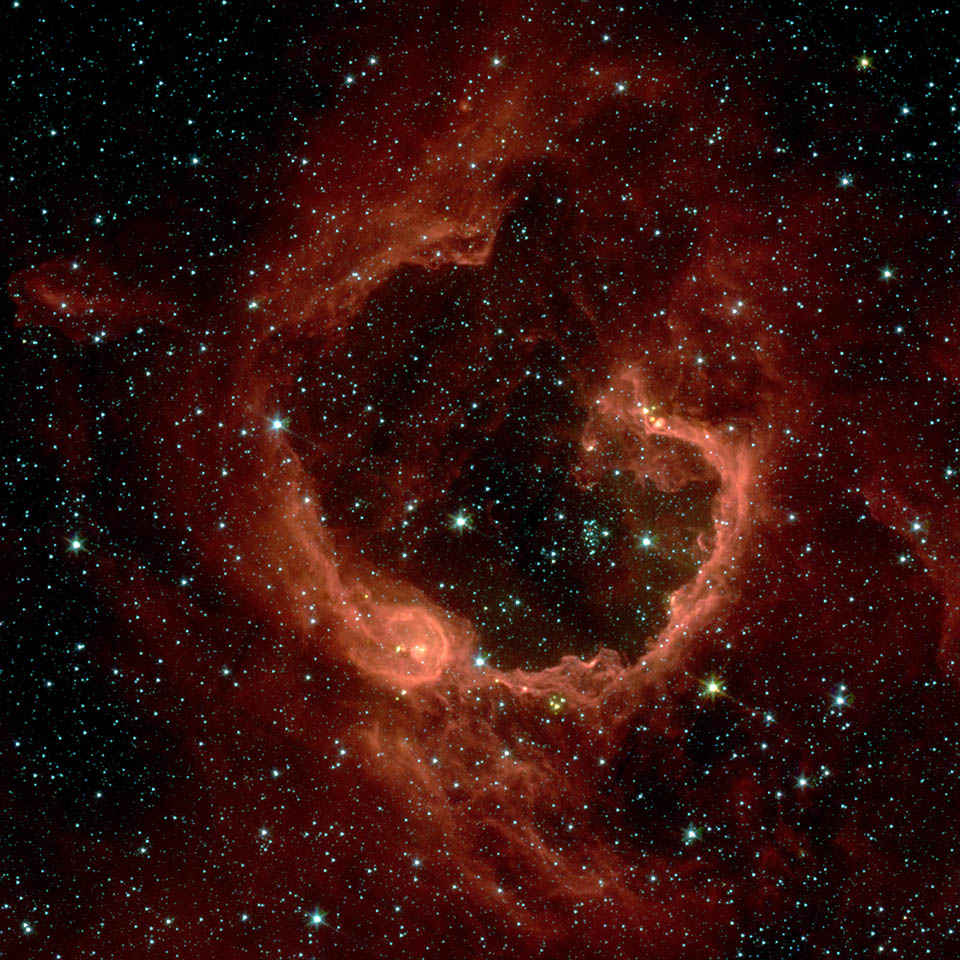
- A Spitzer Space Telescope (SST) image of RCW 79

Observation data: J2000.0 epoch
- Right ascension: 13^{h} 40^{m} 47.3^{s}
- Declination: −61° 42′ 5.1″
- Distance: 17,200 ly (4000 pc)
- Constellation: Centaurus

Physical characteristics
- Radius: 35 ly
- Designations: Gum 48c

RCW 79 is an emission nebula in the constellation Centaurus.

A cosmic bubble of gas and dust, RCW 79 has grown to about 70 light-years in diameter, blown by the winds and radiation from hot young stars. Infrared light from the dust embedded in the nebula is tinted red in this false-color view from the Spitzer Space Telescope. A good 17 thousand light-years away in the grand southern constellation Centaurus, the expanding nebula itself has triggered star formation as it plows into the gas and dust surrounding it. In fact, this penetrating infrared picture reveals groups of new stars as yellowish points scattered along the bubble's edge. One remarkable group still lies within its own natal bubble at about 7 o'clock (lower left), while another can be seen near the upper gap at about 3 o'clock (right) from the bubble's center.

The nebula is estimate to be 2.0–2.5 million years old. It surrounds a central cluster of hot massive stars, with the hottest having spectral types of O4–5.

NASA's Spitzer Space Telescope easily detects infrared light from the dust particles in RCW 79. The young stars within RCW79 radiate ultraviolet light that excites molecules of dust within the bubble. This causes the dust grains to emit infrared light that is detected by Spitzer and seen here as the extended red features.

== See also ==
- RCW Catalogue
- List of largest known nebulae
