= NGC 3576 =

Emission nebula in the constellation Carina

Emission nebula
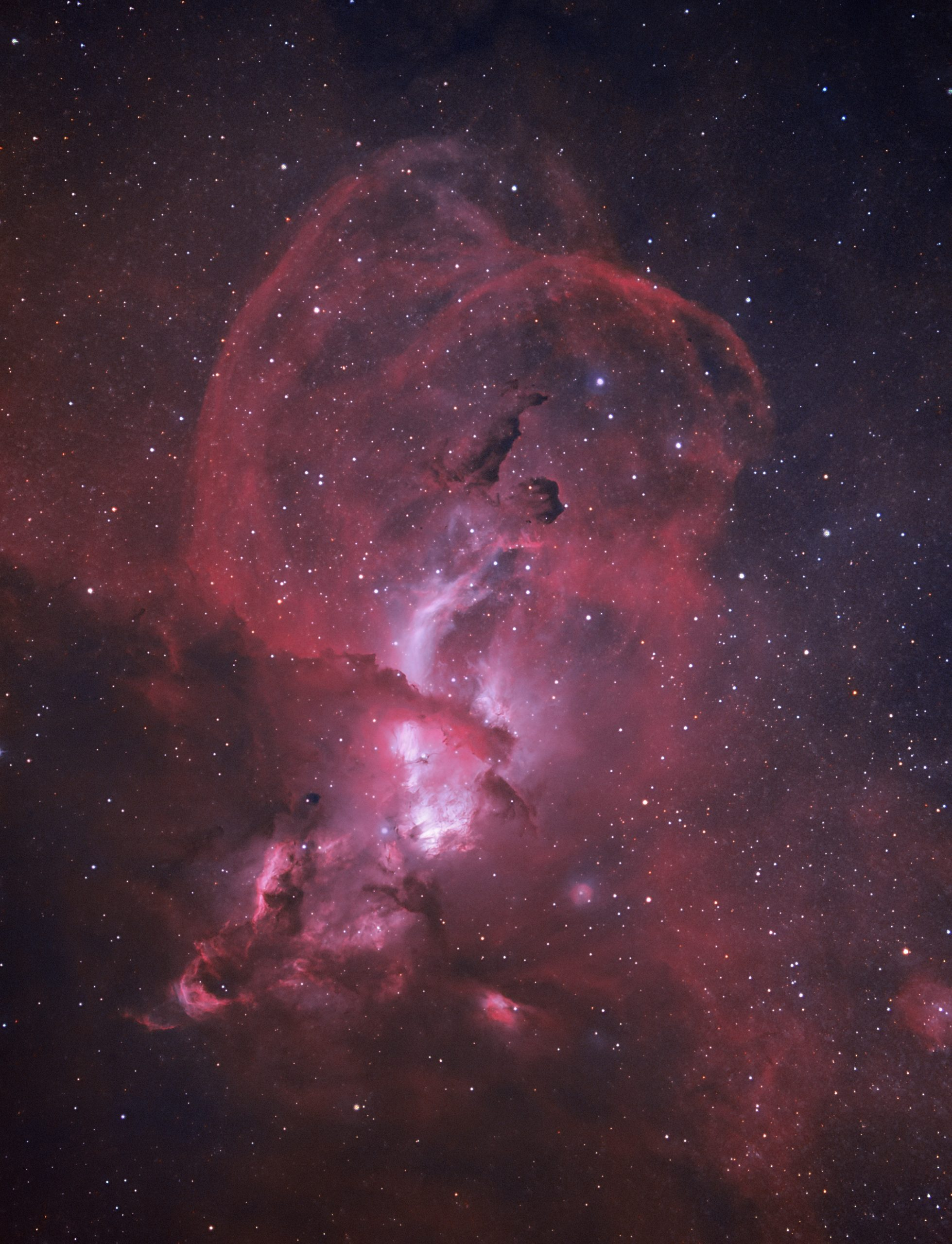
- NGC 3576, also known as the Statue of Liberty Nebula

Observation data: J2000.0 epoch
- Right ascension: 11^{h} 11^{m} 53.2^{s}
- Declination: −61° 18′ 26″
- Distance: 7,800 to 9,800 ly (2,400 to 3,000 pc)
- Constellation: Carina
- Designations: GAL 291.30-00.7, RCW 57A, BRAN 348A, GUM 38a

NGC 3576 (also known as the Statue of Liberty Nebula) is a bright emission nebula and star-forming region in the southern constellation of Carina. It was discovered by John Frederick William Herschel on 16 March 1834. Distance estimates for this complex range from 7.8 to 9.8 thousand light-years.

== Observations ==
This complex is located near the galactic plane along the Carina arm of the Milky Way galaxy. It is approximately 100 light years across and is located near the Eta Carinae nebula, forming the western section of RCW 57. NGC 3576 consists of a giant, star-forming molecular cloud with a luminous H II region positioned just outside. In the infrared, this is one of the brightest H II regions in the galaxy. It is expanding into the molecular cloud and appears to be triggering further star formation. Most of the ionization is believed to be due to two O-type stars, HD 97319 and HD 97484, and two B-type stars, HD 97499 and CPD–60◦2641.

Many of the brightest stars in this formation are still enshrouded in their natal cocoons of gas and dust. A majority of the stars display an infrared excess from the surrounding circumstellar disks. Star formation appears to be progressing in a direction from the northeast to the southwest, with the youngest stars in the latter locale. A very young cluster of massive stars with 130 identified members is embedded deep within the molecular cloud.

== Gallery ==
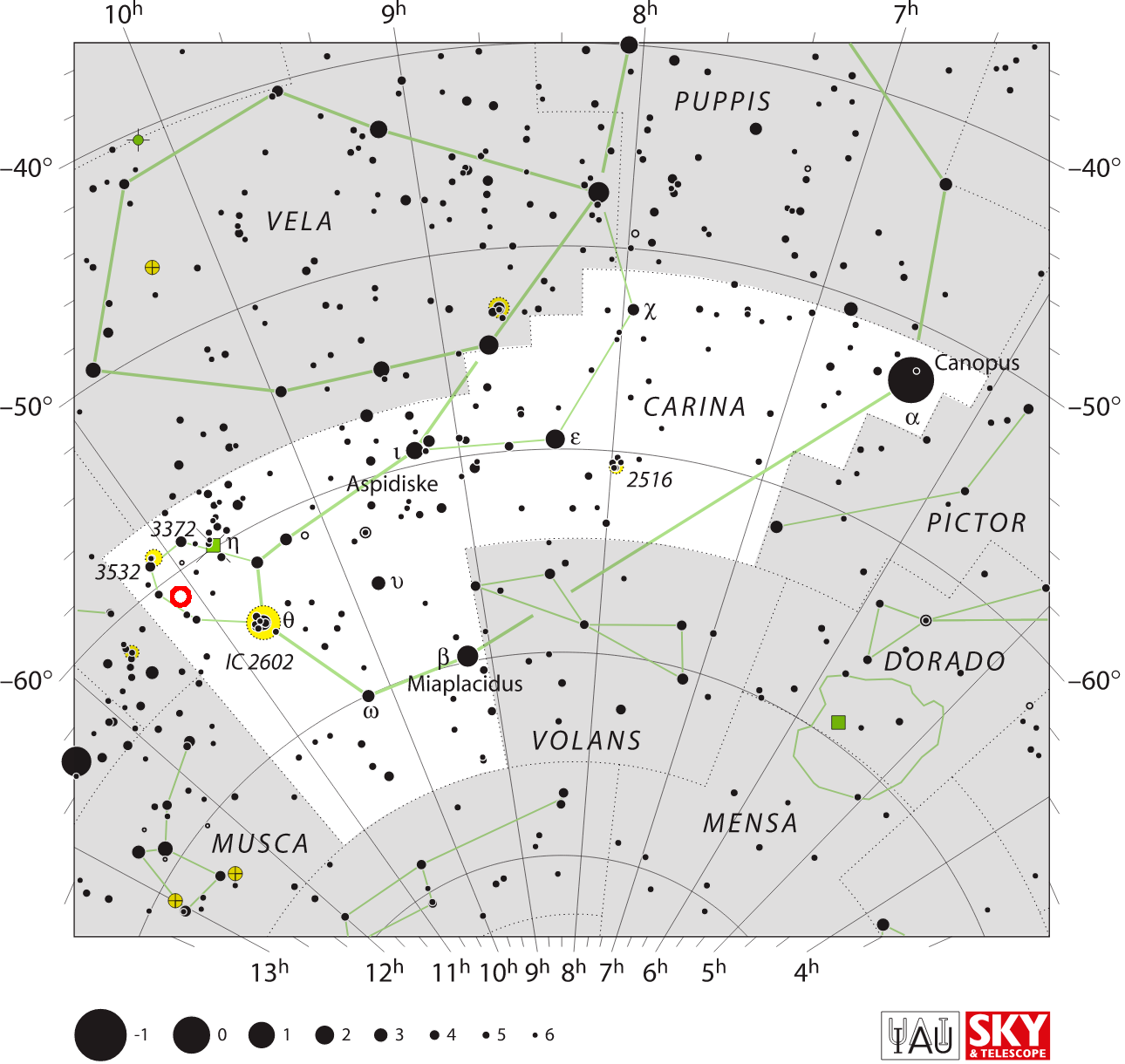
The location of NGC 3576 (circled in red)

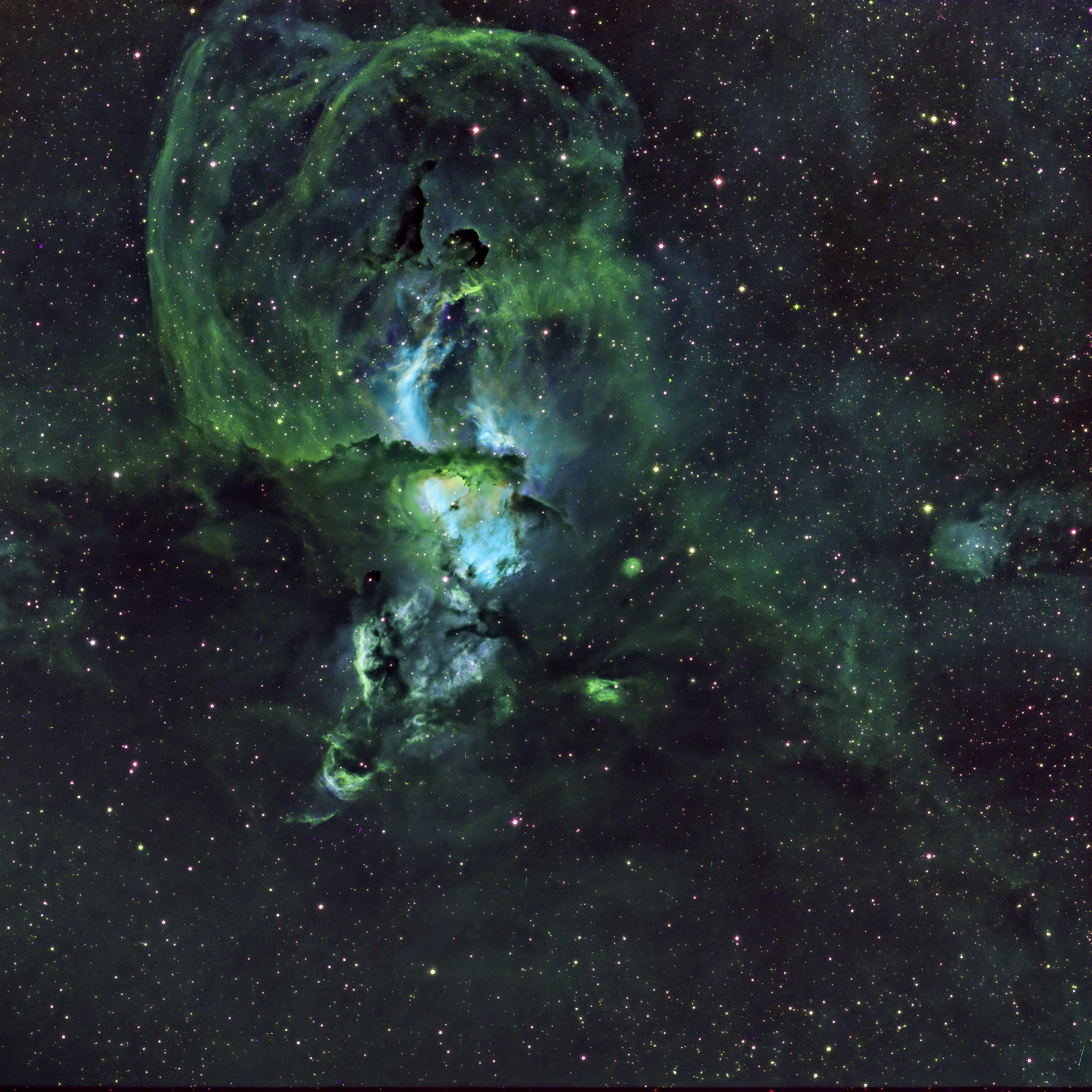
NGC 3576 in Hubble Palette by amateur astronomer Mark Johnston
