= RCW 106 =

Large nebula in Constellation Norma

Emission nebula
- H II region
- RCW 106, as photographed by the Wide Field Imager in 1999

Observation data: J2000.0 epoch
- Right ascension: 16 19 47.0
- Declination: −51 04 06
- Distance: 4,000 ly
- Constellation: Norma
- Designations: NGC 6188

RCW 106 is a large star-forming nebula in the Constellation Norma. RCW 106 is visible in the direction of the R103 OB association and is embedded in a 100 thousand solar mass 28×94 pc^{2} giant molecular cloud. The RCW catalogue designates the two brightest regions of this nebula as RCW 106a and RCW 106b but these do not appear to be distinct objects.
