= RCW 126 =

H II region in constellation Scorpius

Nebula
- H II region
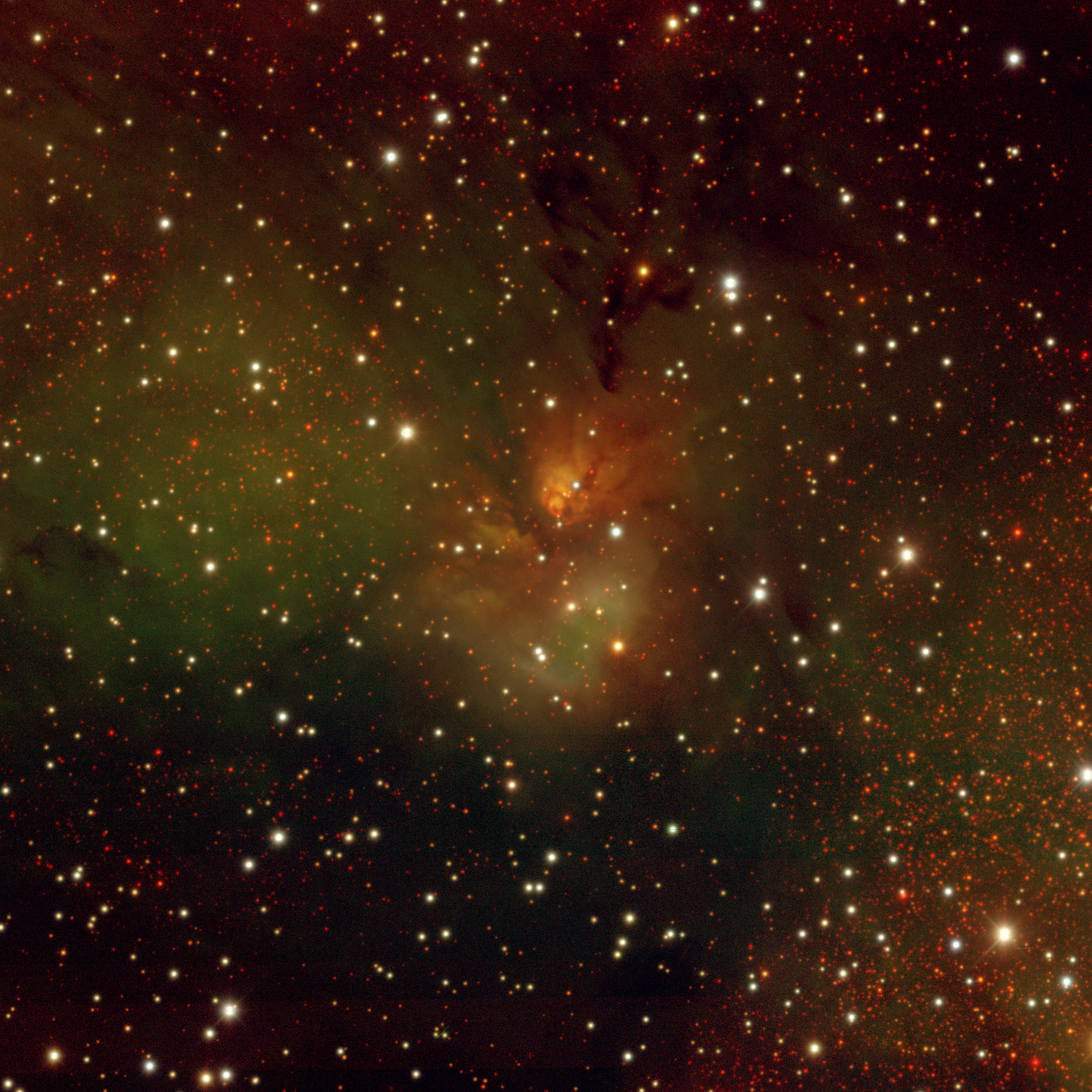
- RCW 126 seen by the Legacy Survey

Observation data: J2000 epoch
- Right ascension: 17^{h} 16^{m} 54^{s}
- Declination: −36° 21′ 00″
- Distance: 5,540 ly (1400-1700 pc)
- Apparent magnitude (V): 15.62
- Constellation: Scorpius
- Designations: BBW 31800a

RCW 126 is an emission nebula in Scorpius, near NGC 6334. Within the nebula is an infrared cluster IRAS 17136-3617, which contains at least 25 stars.
