= RCW 88 =

Emission nebula

Nebula
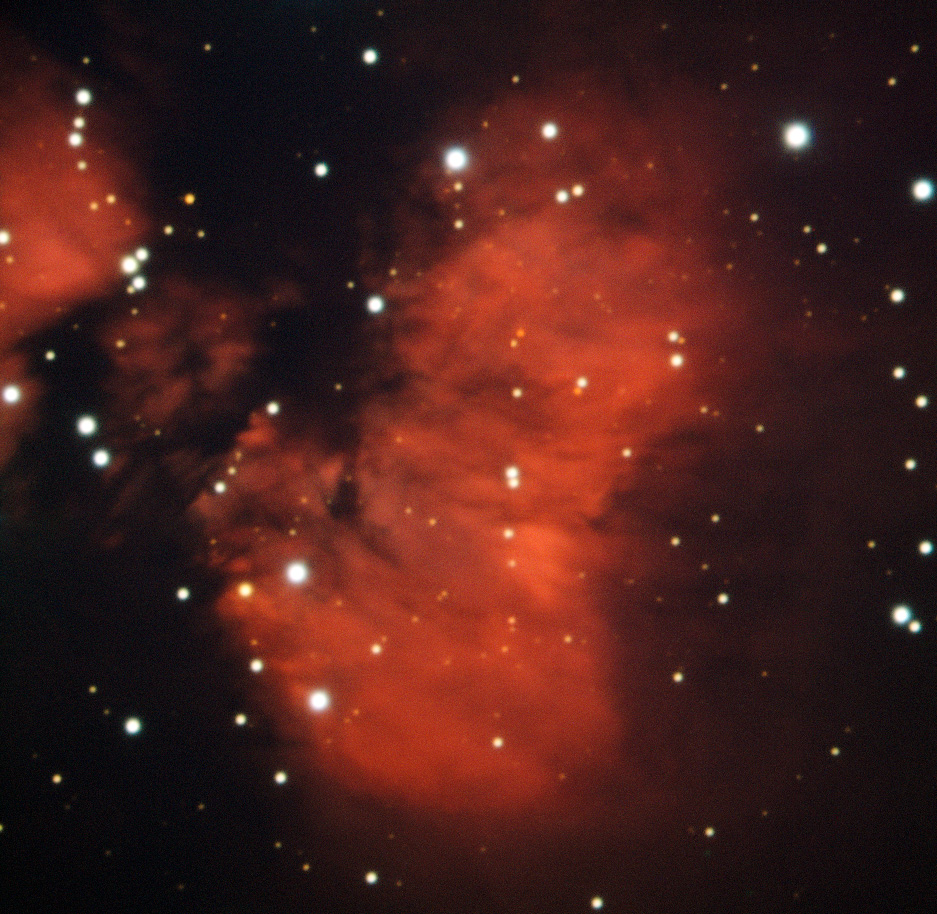
- Star-forming region RCW 88 taken with the EFOSC2 instrument on ESO’s New Technology Telescope.

Observation data: J2000 epoch
- Right ascension: 15^{h} 07^{m} 08^{s}
- Declination: −57° 48.3′ 0″
- Distance: 10.000 ly
- Apparent magnitude (V): 12.0
- Apparent dimensions (V): c. 5'-6'
- Constellation: Circinus

Physical characteristics
- Radius: c.16±3 ly
- Designations: PK 320+00.2, WRAY 16-166, WRAY 16-167, PN ARO 527, ARO 146

RCW 88 is an emission nebula in the southern constellation of Circinus that first appeared in the 1960 astronomical catalogue by Rodgers, Campbell & Whiteoak (RCW) of Hα-emission regions within the southern Milky Way. Earlier observers, like James Wray in 1966, misclassified this as a likely 12.0v magnitude planetary nebula, but later spectroscopic investigations revealed this as a diffuse nebulae. RCW 88 was then to be identified by the infrared satellite IRAS as an HII region.

Deep red images reveal that the inner nebula is divided into two parts by a central dark lane, and there is evidence of a larger halo of fainter nebulosity extending perhaps out to 10 arcmin. The RCW catalogue states the Hα image size is 3'×2.

RCW 88 is located about 3300 parsecs (10,000 light years) from us, though other estimates place this at a closer 1800±300 pc. or 1800±200 pc. Assuming the former distance and the diameter as 5'-6' across, finds by simple trigonometry the true size subtends a minimum of 5±1 parsecs (16±3 light-years.) This small emission nebula shows a mean radial velocity of −18 km.s^{−1}, and is also a faint radio source that was identified by Lloyd Higgs in 1971. Due to the large distance from us, astronomers have made few studies into the nature of RCW 88.

== Field Star ==
There is a 10.8v magnitude star identified as TYC 8702-56-1 positioned at RA : 15h 07m 25.1s Dec. : –57° 48' 32" (2000), place 137 arc seconds southwest of the centre of the bright nebulosity. It is unlikely that this star is associated with the nebulosity being probably a field star.
