= Sh 2-306 =

Molecular cloud

Sharpless 2-306
Nebula

Observation data: J2000 epoch
- Right ascension: 07^{h} 31^{m} 02^{s}
- Declination: −19° 09′ 17″
- Distance: 4200 pc
- Apparent dimensions (V): 30' x 30'
- Constellation: Puppis
- Designations: BRAN 39, RCW 10, LBN 1050

Sh 2-306 (also designated RCW 10), is an emission nebula and H II region located in the southern constellation Puppis. It is catalogued in the Sharpless catalog and forms part of a large star-forming complex within the Perseus Arm of the Milky Way. It is located close to Sh 2-309.

Three stars are responsible for the ionization of the nebula LSS 458 (O6.5V((f))z), LSS 499 (OB) and LSS 467 (O9). These stars are embedded within a giant molecular cloud complex sometimes referred to as JKK96 D. Sh 2-306 is situated near the center of the GS234-02 supershell, a vast infrared-emitting ring structure spanning several degrees, believed to be the result of multiple supernova explosions and stellar winds from previous generations of massive stars.
