= Sh 2-34 =

Molecular cloud

Sharpless 2-34
Nebula
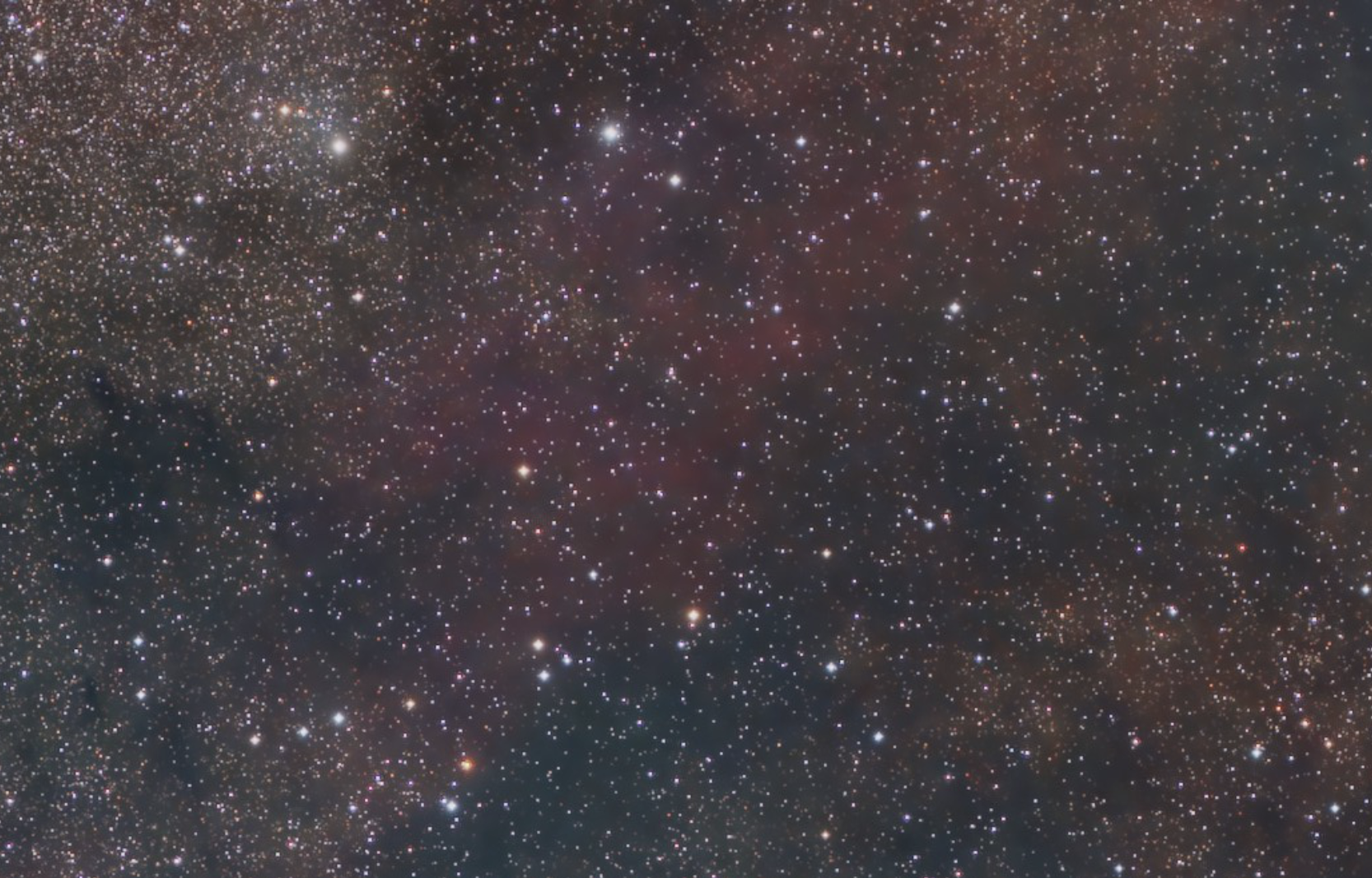
- As seen in 2024

Observation data: J2000 epoch
- Right ascension: 18^{h} 06^{m} 24^{s}
- Declination: −21° 39′ 00″
- Distance: 4570 ly (1400 pc)
- Apparent magnitude (V): 16.73
- Apparent dimensions (V): 130' x 40'
- Constellation: Sagittarius

Physical characteristics
- Radius: 173 ly
- Designations: Gum 77, RCW 149, LBN 38

Sh 2-34, also known as the Forgotten Nebula is a nebula in Sagittarius. It is a star-forming region and contains multiple filamentary structures. Most of the nebula is composed of hydrogen and sulfur, with a region of oxygen.

The designation Gum 77 also applies to Sh 2-35, as Gum 77b, despite no relation or proximity between the objects.
