= Sh 2-18 =

Emission nebula

Sharpless 2-18
Emission nebula
- H II region
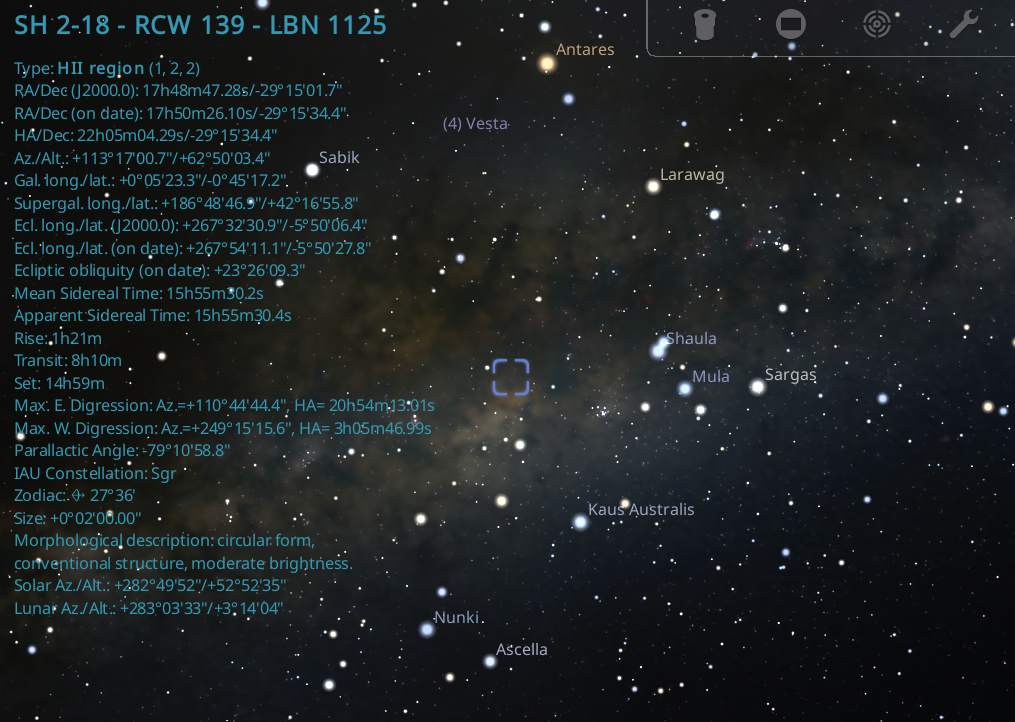
- The location of Sh 2-18 in the sky, (in the open source Stellarium software)

Observation data: J2000 epoch
- Right ascension: 17^{h} 48^{m} 48^{s}
- Declination: −29° 15′ 0″
- Distance: 4,890 ly
- Apparent magnitude (V): 15.51
- Apparent dimensions (V): 4' x 4'
- Constellation: Sagittarius

Physical characteristics
- Radius: 6 ly
- Designations: RCW 139, LBN 1125

Sh 2-18 is an emission nebula in the constellation Sagittarius. It is part of the Sharpless Catalog assembled by Stewart Sharpless. It lies next to Sh 2-19. It contains the infrared cluster [DB2000] 1. The nebula appears to be circular in shape.
