= Sh 2-50 =

Emission nebula

Sharpless 2-50
Emission nebula
- H II region
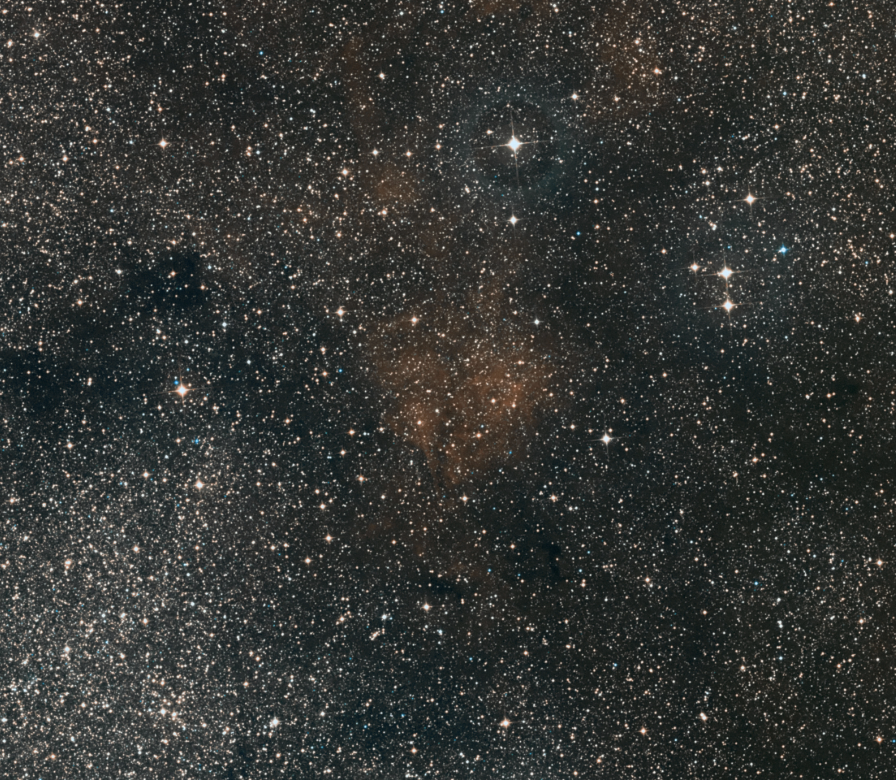

Observation data: epoch
- Right ascension: 18^{h} 22^{m} 30^{s}
- Declination: −14° 42′ 42″
- Distance: 5540 ly (1870 pc)
- Constellation: Scutum

Physical characteristics
- Dimensions: 35'
- Designations: RCW 164, LBN 62

Sh 2-50 is an emission nebula in Scutum. It is located only 2.5° away from the Eagle Nebula.

It is in the direction of the open cluster Dolidze 28. It is a star-forming region, and a radio source. Despite being nearby, the supernova remnant SNR G16.8-1.1 is unrelated.
