= RCW 114 =

Supernova remnant in the constellation Ara

Supernova remnant

Observation data: J2000.0 epoch
- Right ascension: 17^{h} 25^{m} 0.00^{s}
- Declination: −46° 30′ 0.0″
- Distance: ~600 to ~4,900 ly
- Constellation: Ara

Physical characteristics
- Radius: 163 ly
- Designations: G 343.0-06.0, GRS G343.00-06.00, SNR G343.0-06.0

RCW 114, also known as the Dragon's Heart is a massive faint supernova remnant (SNR) located 200 or 1,500 parsecs away in the constellation Ara. The remnant was discovered in 1960 by Alexander Rodgers, Colin Campbell, and John Whiteoak in their catalogue of Hα emission nebulae.

== Structure ==
RCW 114 was originally thought to be a Wolf–Rayet nebula but was later proven to be an old supernova remnant (SNR). RCW 114 is an ancient and faint SNR with an angular size of approximately 250 arcminutes. It has a diameter of about 326 ly and a radius of 163 ly. The shell interactions and shock-wave dynamics with the ambient interstellar medium (ISM) result in a radial expansion speed between 25 and 35 km/s.

The star that most likely produced RCW 114 is pulsar B1727-47, the distance of the pulsar is ~0.6 kpc, which is consistent with a distance of ~600 ly. Another study found that the pulsar formed near the center of RCW 114.

== History ==
A 2003 study originally suggested that RCW 114 was a Wolf–Rayet nebula that was produced by the star HD 156385. HD 156385 is a B-type WR progenitor star at a distance of ~1,500 pc, which produced a small wind-blown bubble with a mass of 6,200 M_{☉} and a kinetic energy of ~10⁵⁰ ergs. These values match with the kinetic energy of RCW 114, which is ≥10⁵¹ ergs. HD 156385 was also thought to be responsible for the observed Si II and Na I absorption lines. These lines were linked to a pre-existing SNR where RCW 114 expanded. Estimates put the age of RCW 114 at 5 x 1,000,000 or 1.1 x 1,000,000 years, which aligned with the age of HD 156385. This suggested a distance for RCW 114 of ~4,900 ly or ~1,500 pc with a radius of ~50 pc for RCW 114.

A 2010 study detected a C IV emission-line in RCW 114 and gave a distance of ~200 pc (~600 ly) based on luminosity estimations. This placed the distance of RCW 114 much closer than HD 156385, meaning that HD 156385 is not associated with RCW 114 as well as the wind-blown bubble around the star. The C IV emission-line also proved that the pre-existing SNR is actually a part of RCW 114, confirming that RCW 114 is an old SNR. The global morphologies of the C IV, Hα, H I emissions show that RCW 114 formed in a non-uniform interstellar medium (ISM). The low density southeast region that overlaps the line of sight of HD 156385 explains why it was associated with RCW 114.
