= Sh 2-297 =

Emission nebula

Emission nebula
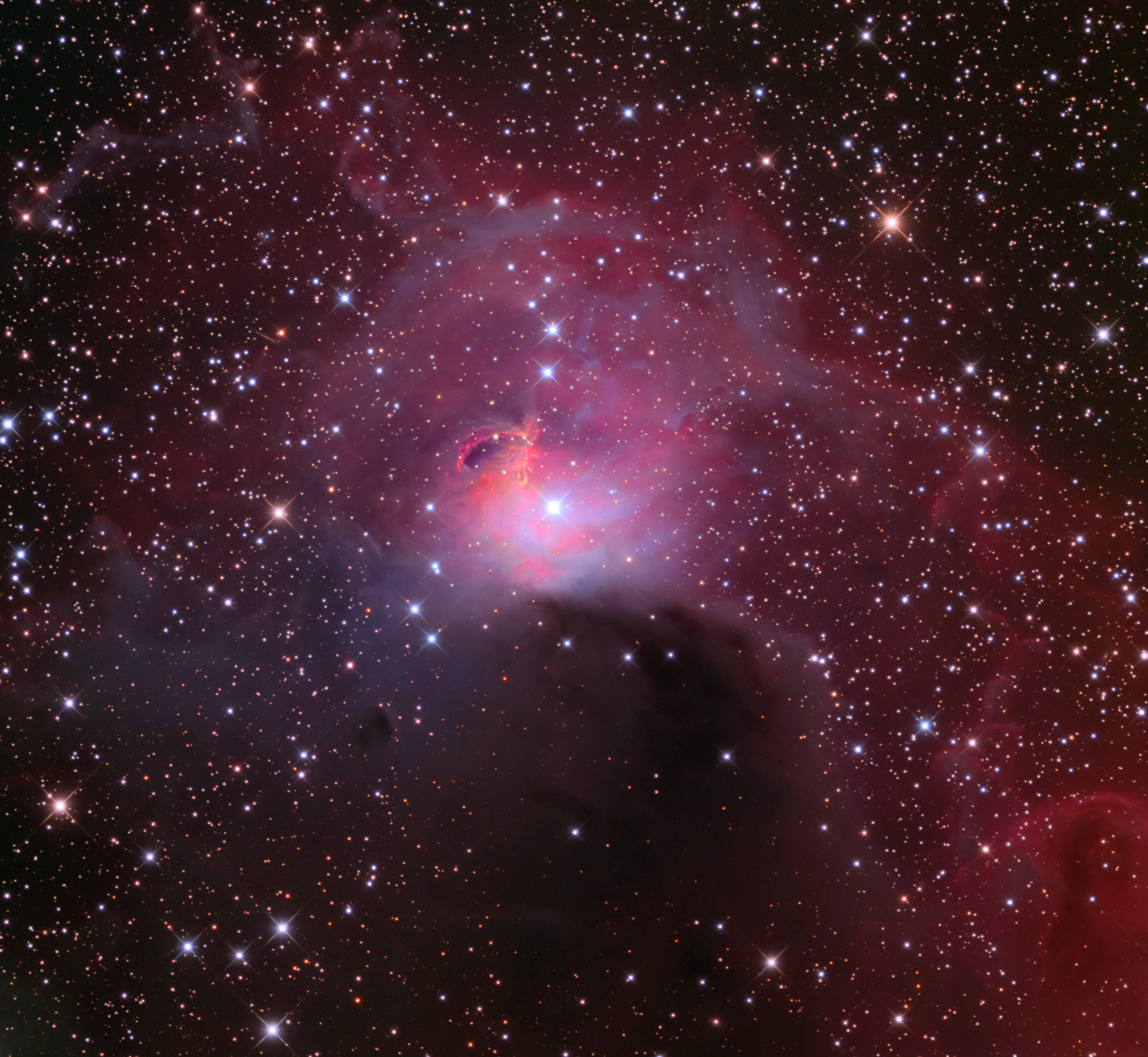

Observation data: J2000.0 epoch
- Right ascension: 07^{h} 05^{m} 13.0^{s}
- Declination: -12° 19′ 00″
- Distance: 3,300–4,600 ly
- Constellation: Canis Major
- Designations: Sh-297, LBN 1039, Ced 90 RCW 1a

Sh 2-297 (also known as Sharpless 297) is an emission nebula in the constellation Canis Major. The region was catalogued in 1959 in the extended seconded edition of the Sharpless catalogue. This area is part of the Canis Major OB1 Association, and is a very active area of new star formation.

Studies in 1988 found that the bright star illuminating the nebula was 8th magnitude HD 53623 / HIP 34178 with spectral class B1II/III. Later in 2004 it was shown that there was embedded a cold but massive Young Stellar Object or YSO within Sh 2-297 near the edge of one of the dark rifts. This object has been observed in the far-infrared, but it is so deeply embedded in an interstellar cloud that it is undetectable in shorter wavelength observations such as the Two Micron All Sky Survey (2MASS), leading it to be originally named "Unidentified young stellar object 1" or UYSO-1. It was further revealed that this unseen stellar source produces a carbon monoxide (CO) bipolar outflow with a total mass of 5.4 M_{☉} solar masses, while the surrounding extended envelope weighs 30 M_{☉}–40 M_{☉}. Some 96 other YSOs have been discovered to be part of Sh-297, having a mean age of one million years and range in masses between 0.3 M_{☉} and 2.0 M_{☉}. Many variable stars are also assigned with this nebula complex, including the three brightest: MW Ori, TT Ori and V559 Ori.

Distance is estimated between 1.0 and 1.4 kpc. (3,300–4,600 ly.), averaging 1.2 kpc. or 3,900 ly.

== History of observation ==
This region was catalogued as part of the major clustering of reflection nebula as CMa R1 by van den Bergh in 1966. Reflection nebulas were identified on blue plates of the Palomar Sky Survey, with positive confirmation made by checking nebulosity on the red plates. It was again later catalogued as LBN 1037 or LBN 225.27-02.42

== See also ==
- IC 2177
- Southern celestial hemisphere
