= Stock 16 =

Open cluster in the constellation Centaurus

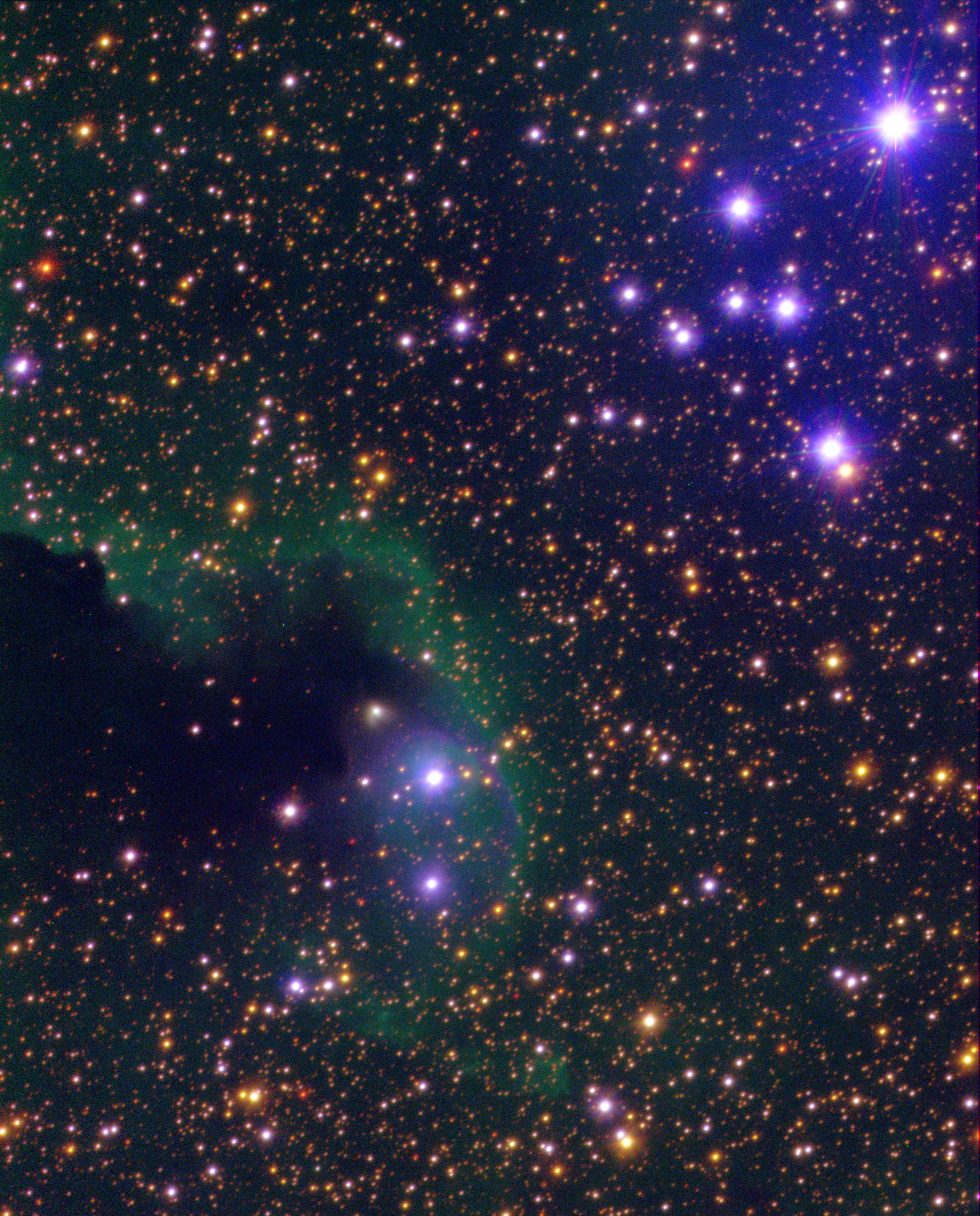
- ESO VST image of the most massive stars in Stock 16 in the upper right and some nebulosity of RCW 75 on the lower left

Observation data (J2000 epoch)
- Right ascension: 13^{h} 19^{m} 29^{s}
- Declination: −62° 38.0′
- Distance: 6200 ly (1900 pc)
- Apparent dimensions (V): 18′ x 13′

Physical characteristics
- Estimated age: 4–6 Myr
- Other designations: C 1315-623

Associations
- Constellation: Centaurus

Stock 16 is a very young Galactic open cluster in the H II region RCW 75 (= Gum 48a). This region lies at the end of an "elephant trunk" shaped molecular cloud and may be a region with triggered star formation. The primary ionizing source for the H II region is the star HD 115455, with spectral type O7.5 III.

RCW 75 is also Gum 48a.

In Turner's 1985 paper The young open cluster Stock 16: an example of star formation in an elephant trunk? it was proposed the Stock 16 cluster was an example of star formation. The study included UBV photometry of over thirty stars in the cluster.

It is the 16th object in Jürgen Stock's catalogue of open clusters.
