= RCW 135 =

Planetary Nebula

Nebula
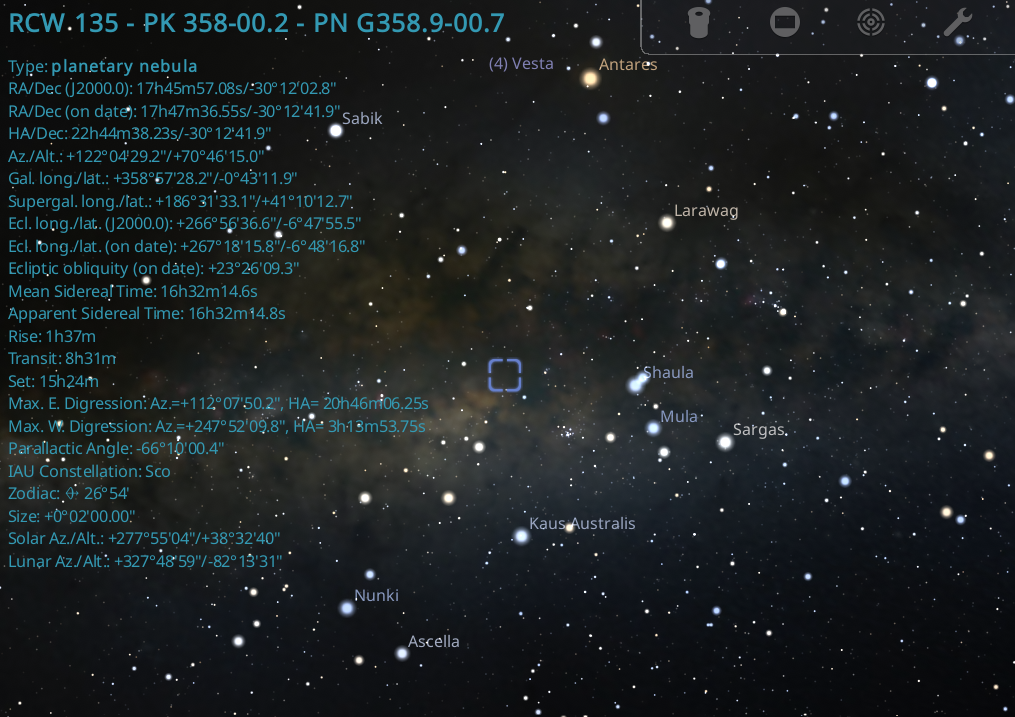
- Location of the RCW 135 nebula (using the Stellarium software)

Observation data: J2000 epoch
- Right ascension: 17^{h} 45^{m} 57^{s}
- Declination: −30° 12′ 00″
- Apparent dimensions (V): 10"
- Constellation: Scorpius
- Designations: ESO 455-33, Hen 2-277, IRAS 17427-3010, PN M 1-26, SCM 160

RCW 135 is a planetary nebula in Scorpius. It was discovered by Rudolph Minkowski in 1946.

== Structure ==
The nebula is a series of loops and arcs, surrounding a bright shell. Some outer loops point away from the center of the nebula. The total size of the nebula is 10", however the central shell is only 2.5". It has been proposed that the nebula contains a triple-star system at its core.
