= RCW 42 =

Nebula in the Milky Way

Emission nebula
- H II region
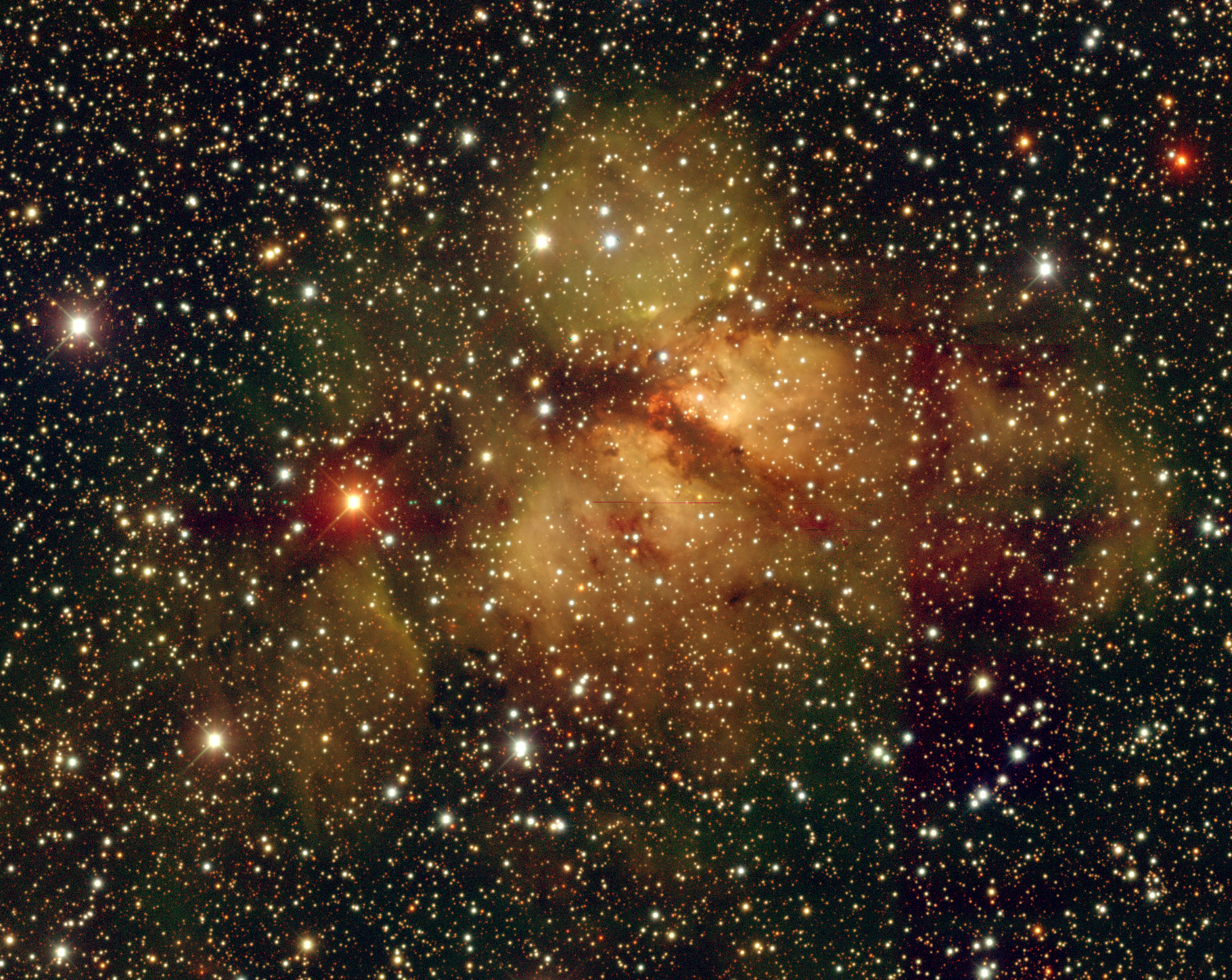
- RCW 42 by the legacy surveys

Observation data: J2000.0 epoch
- Right ascension: N/A
- Declination: N/A
- Distance: 20,000 ly
- Constellation: Vela
- Designations: RCW 42, Gum 26, "Caught Pink-Handed" Nebula

RCW 42 (or Gum 26) is a giant H II region in the Milky Way. It contains DBS2003 38, a deeply embedded infrared cluster. It lies at the western edge of the immense galactic chimney GSH 277+00+36. Not much research has been done on RCW 42, which is unusual, given that its status as a giant H II region suggests that it is one of the greatest and largest regions of star formation in the Milky Way.
