= RCW 108 =

Star formation in the Milky Way

Emission nebula
- H II region
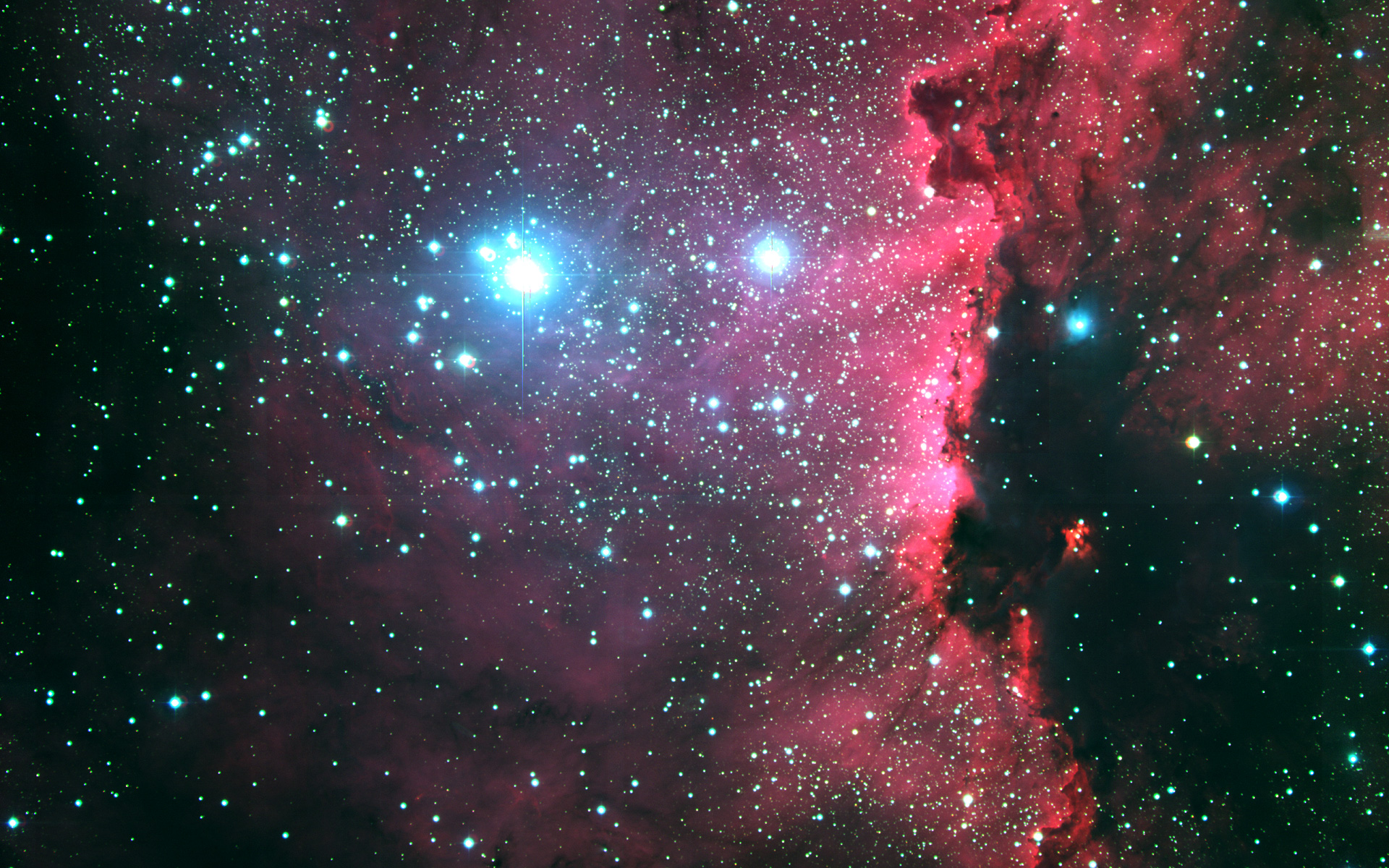
- RCW 108, as photographed by the Wide Field Imager in 1999

Observation data: J2000.0 epoch
- Right ascension: N/A
- Declination: N/A
- Distance: 4,000 ly
- Constellation: Ara
- Designations: Rim Nebula, NGC 6188

RCW 108 is a large star formation region in Carina–Sagittarius arm of the Milky Way, about 4,000 light years from Earth. It is located in the Constellation Ara. RCW 108 is in the process of being destroyed by intense light, which radiates from massive star insides it including stars in the star cluster NGC 6193. NGC 6188 or Rim Nebula, which is a part of RCW 108, has an angular extent of 20.0' × 12.0', and has been heavily documented by multiple telescopes, including Chandra and Spitzer.

== Gallery ==
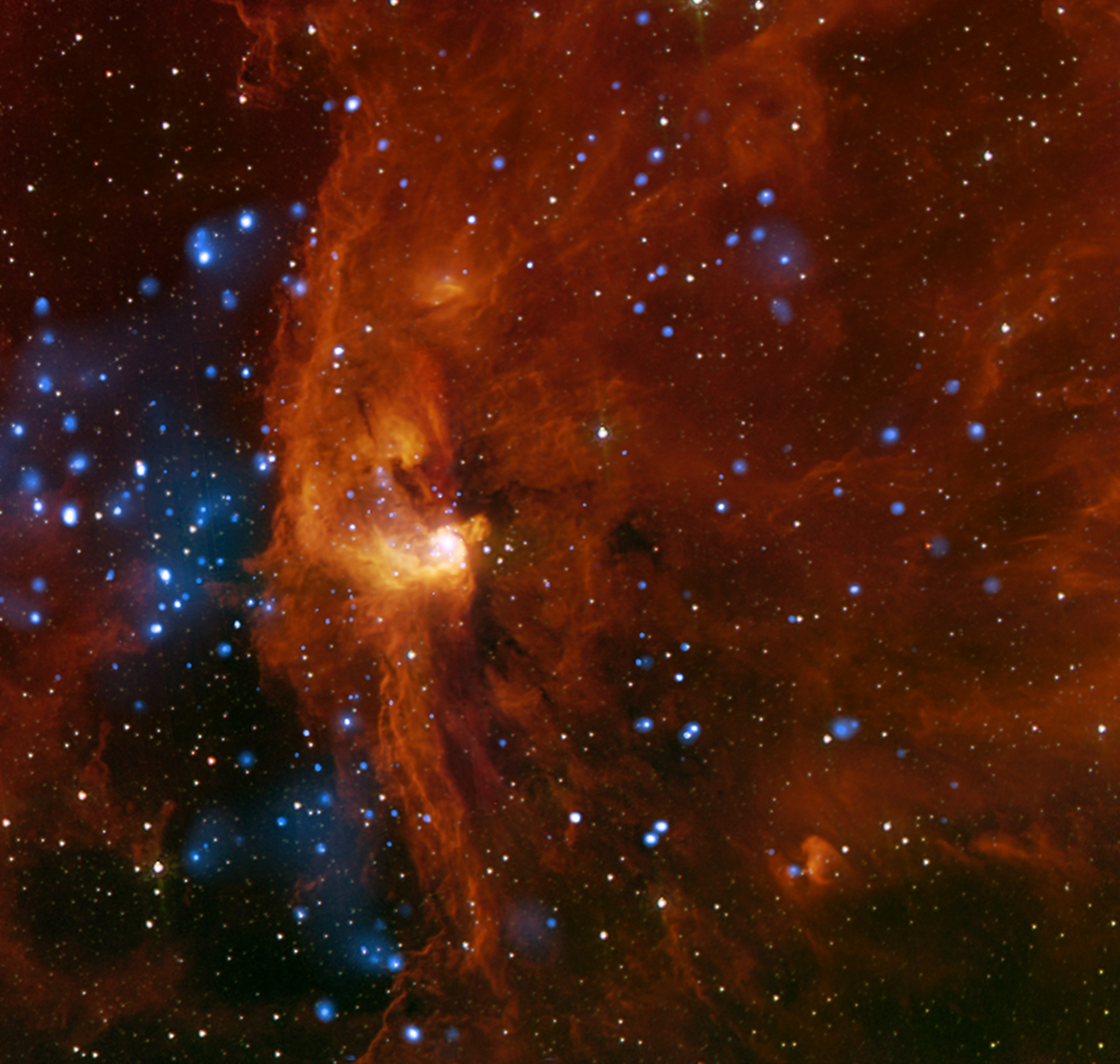
Composite of X-ray data from NASA's Chandra X-ray Observatory (blue) and infrared emission detected by NASA's Spitzer Space Telescope (red and orange)

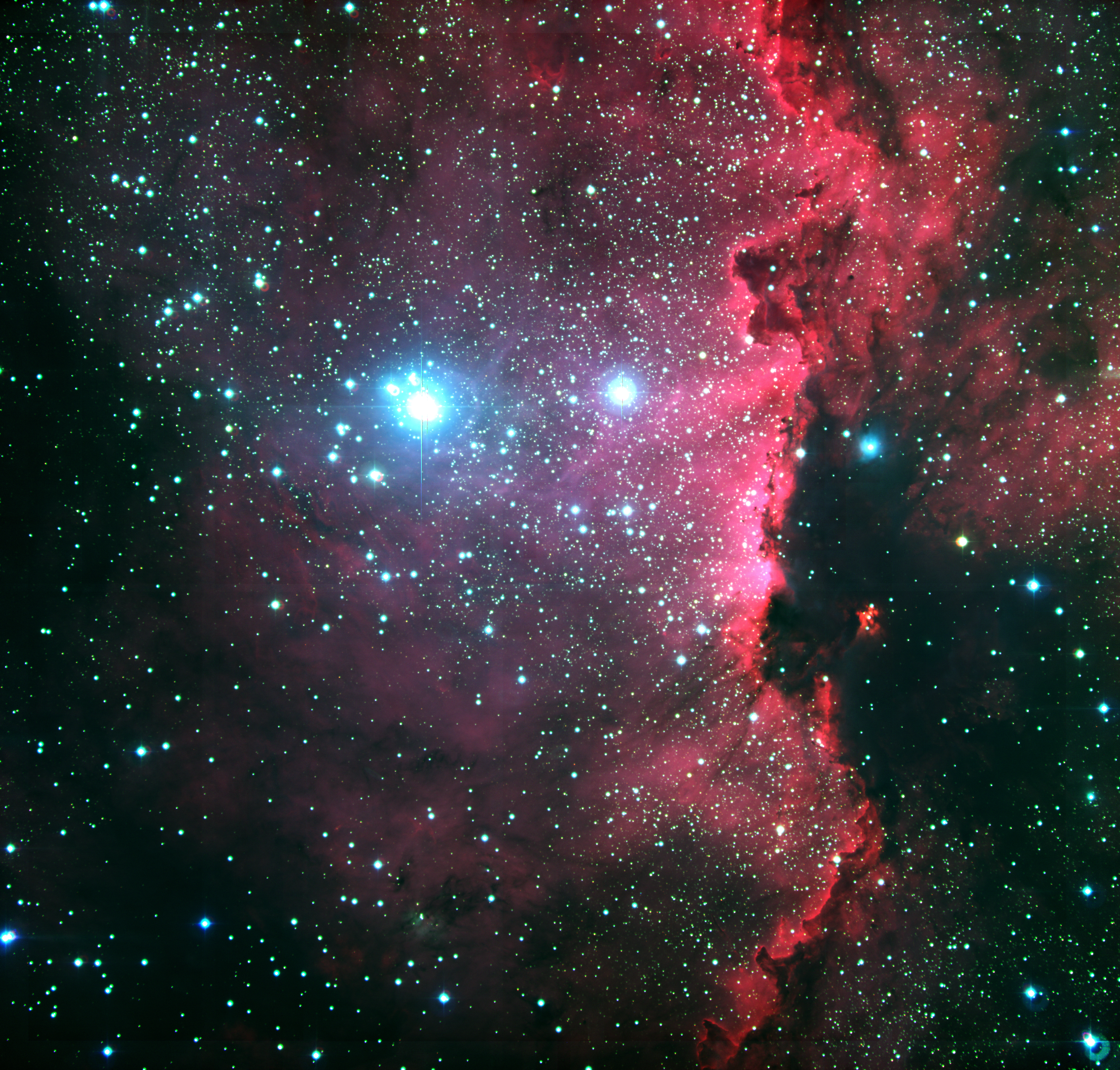
1999 composite from the Wide Field Imager

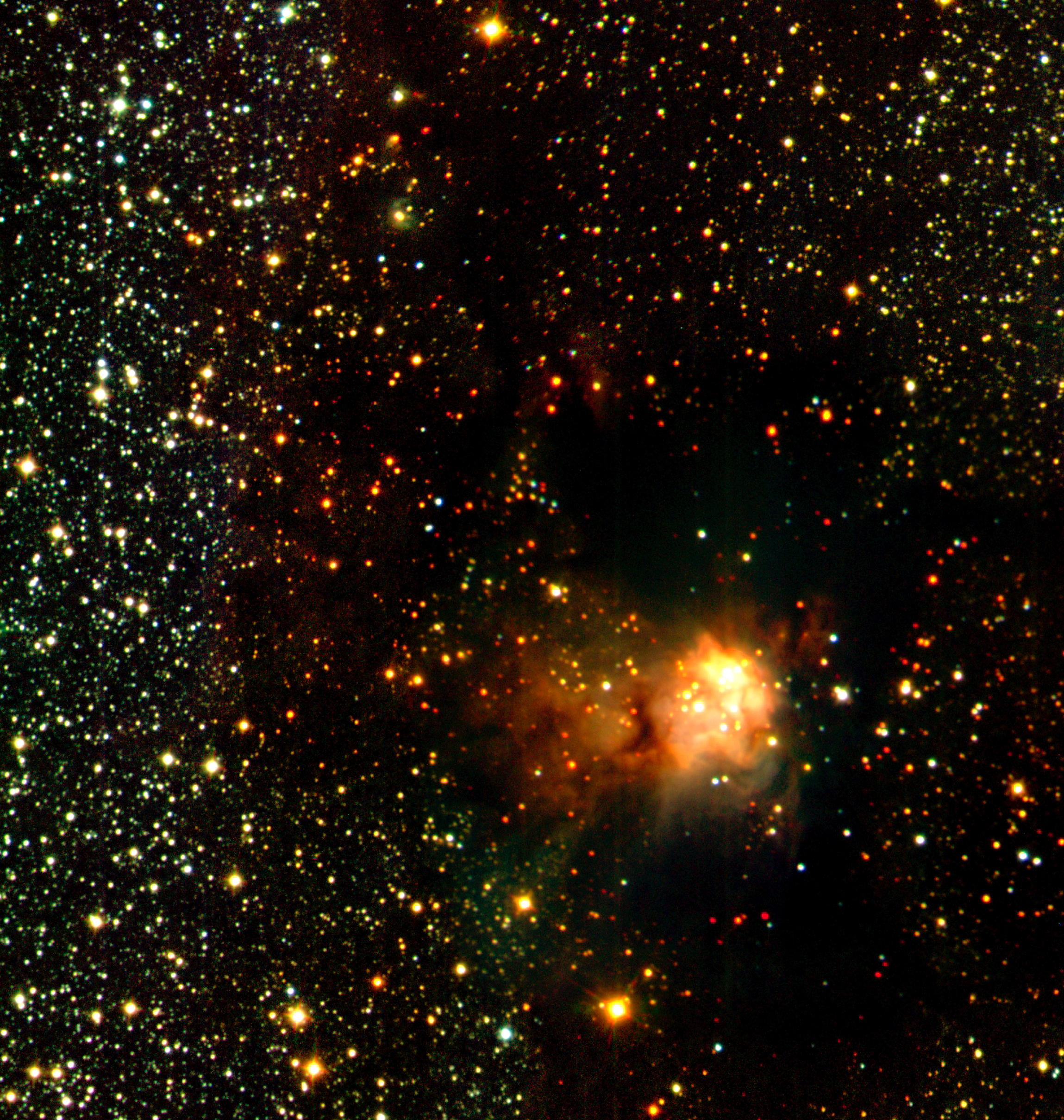
Based on approx. 600 individual exposures with the SOFI instrument at the 3.58-m ESO New Technology Telescope
