= AFGL 2591 =

Star in the constellation Cygnus

Reflection nebula
- molecular cloud
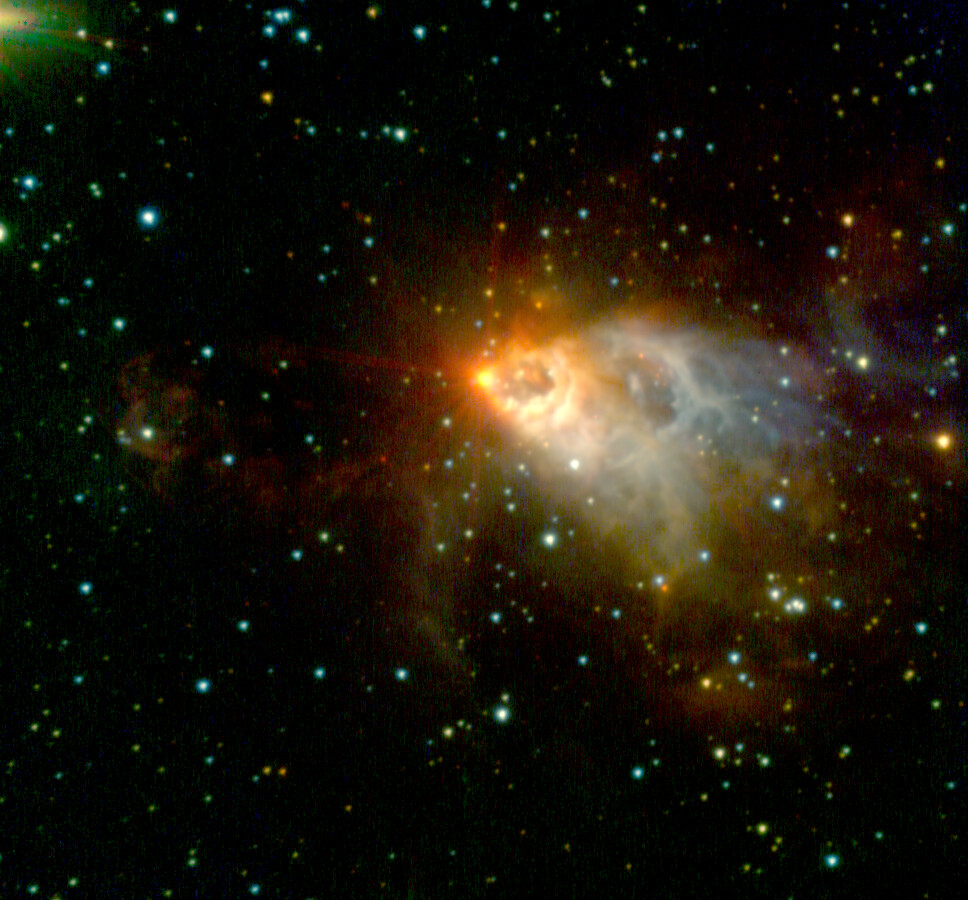

Observation data: J2000 epoch
- Right ascension: 20^{h} 29^{m} 24.867^{s}
- Declination: +40° 11′ 19.41″
- Distance: 3330±110 pc
- Apparent diameter: 0.51'
- Constellation: Cygnus

Physical characteristics
- Radius: est. 0.87–2.0 pc
- Notable features: high-mass star-forming region
- Designations: AFGL 2591; IRAS 20275+4001; RAFGL 2591

AFGL 2591 is a star forming region in the constellation Cygnus. Its dense cloud of gas and dust make its interior invisible to optical telescopes. Images in the infrared show a bright young stellar object, with an associated reflection nebula seen as a glowing cone projecting from the young star. A cluster of stars is forming within the molecular cloud, but most of the infrared radiation is coming from this star, AFGL 2591-VLA3.

Initially AFGL 2591 was thought to be a single young, massive star expelling clouds of gas and dust in multiple events. It was estimated to be about 10 times the mass of the sun and at a distance of only 1,000 parsecs (3,300 light-years).
