= Sh 2-305 =

Emission nebula and H II region

Sharpless 2-305
Nebula
- H II region
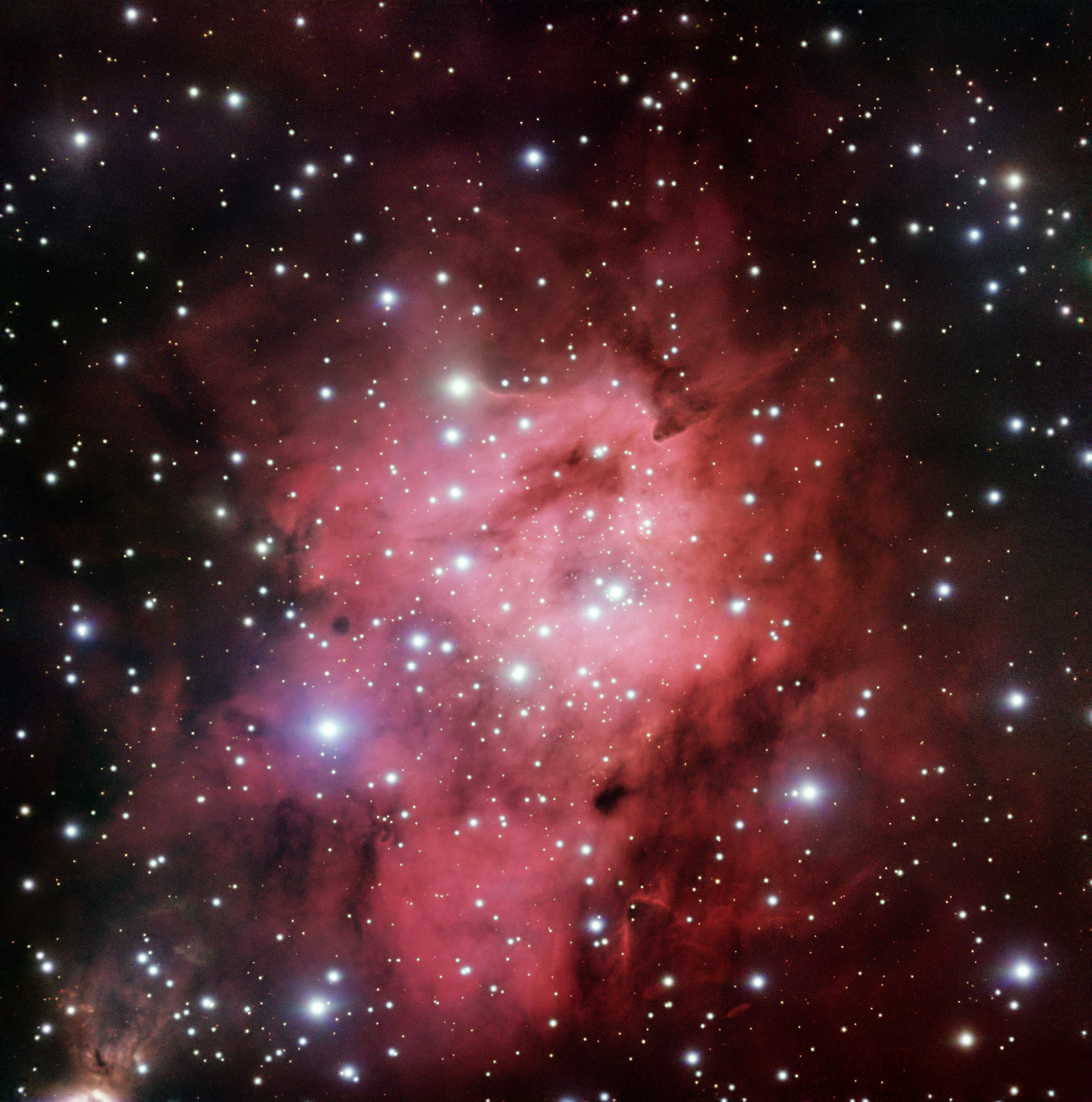
- Image of Sh 2-305 Nebula

Observation data: epoch
- Right ascension: 07^{h} 30^{m} 4.10^{s}
- Declination: −18° 32′ 13.0″
- Distance: 13,600 ly (4,200 pc)
- Constellation: Puppis
- Designations: Sh 2-305, RCW 8, LBN 1048

Sh 2-305 (also known as Sharpless 305 or RCW 8) is an H II region and emission nebula located in the constellation Puppis. It is a prominent example of a hot bubble of ionized hydrogen gas, sculpted and illuminated by intense ultraviolet radiation from embedded massive young stars. Sh 2-305 forms part of a larger star-forming complex within the Perseus Arm of the Milky Way and is associated with ongoing stellar birth in dense molecular clouds.

== Charecterstics ==
The nebula is ionized by a pair of massive O-type stars [VM75] Sh 2-305 4 (O8.5V) and [VM75] Sh 2-305 2 (O9.5V) accompanied by a pair of B-type stars [VM75] Sh 2-305 7 (B0V) and [VM75] Sh 2-305 8 (B0V). The stellar population also encompasses a younger generation, including the loose infrared cluster [DBS2003] 5 and the open cluster Mayer 3 (also designated C 0727-184). This multi-generational assembly reflects sequential star formation triggered by supernova remnants or cloud collisions within the GS234-02 supershell. Surrounding the ionized zone are photon-dominated regions (PDRs), transitional layers where far-ultraviolet radiation dissociates molecules and heats dust grains, observable in infrared wavelengths.

The region is embedded in a giant molecular cloud complex, part of the star formation region SFR 233.75-0.18. Radio and infrared observations reveal dense clumps of gas and dust, with associated water maser emissions indicating active accretion onto protostars. Surveys have identified approximately 116 young stellar objects (YSOs) in the vicinity, underscoring its role as a site of low to intermediate-mass star formation.

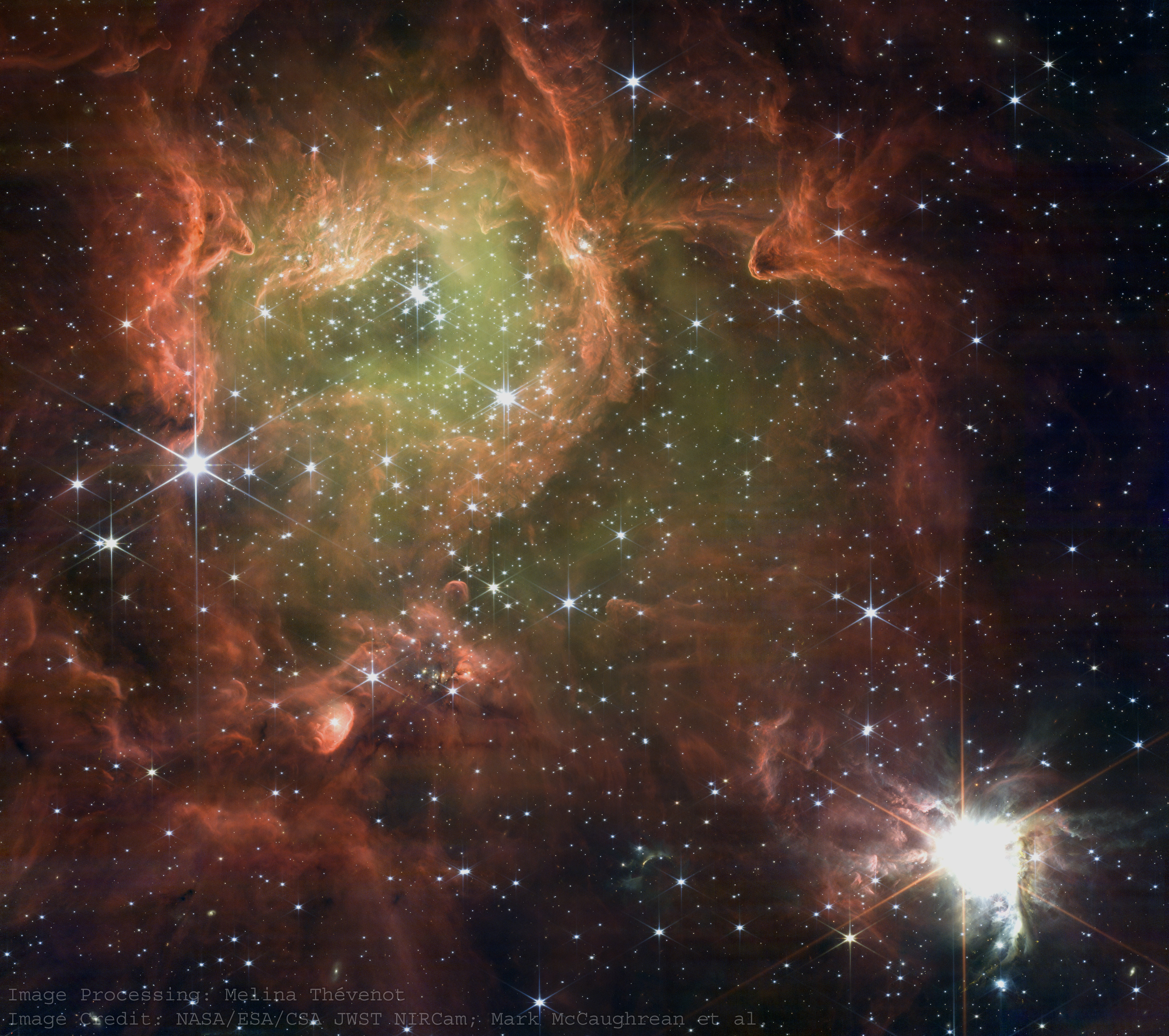
James Webb Space Telescope NIRCam image of Sharpless 305 and the protostar RAFGL 5232 (lower right)
