= NGC 6357 =

Emission nebula in the constellation Scorpius

Emission nebula
- H II region
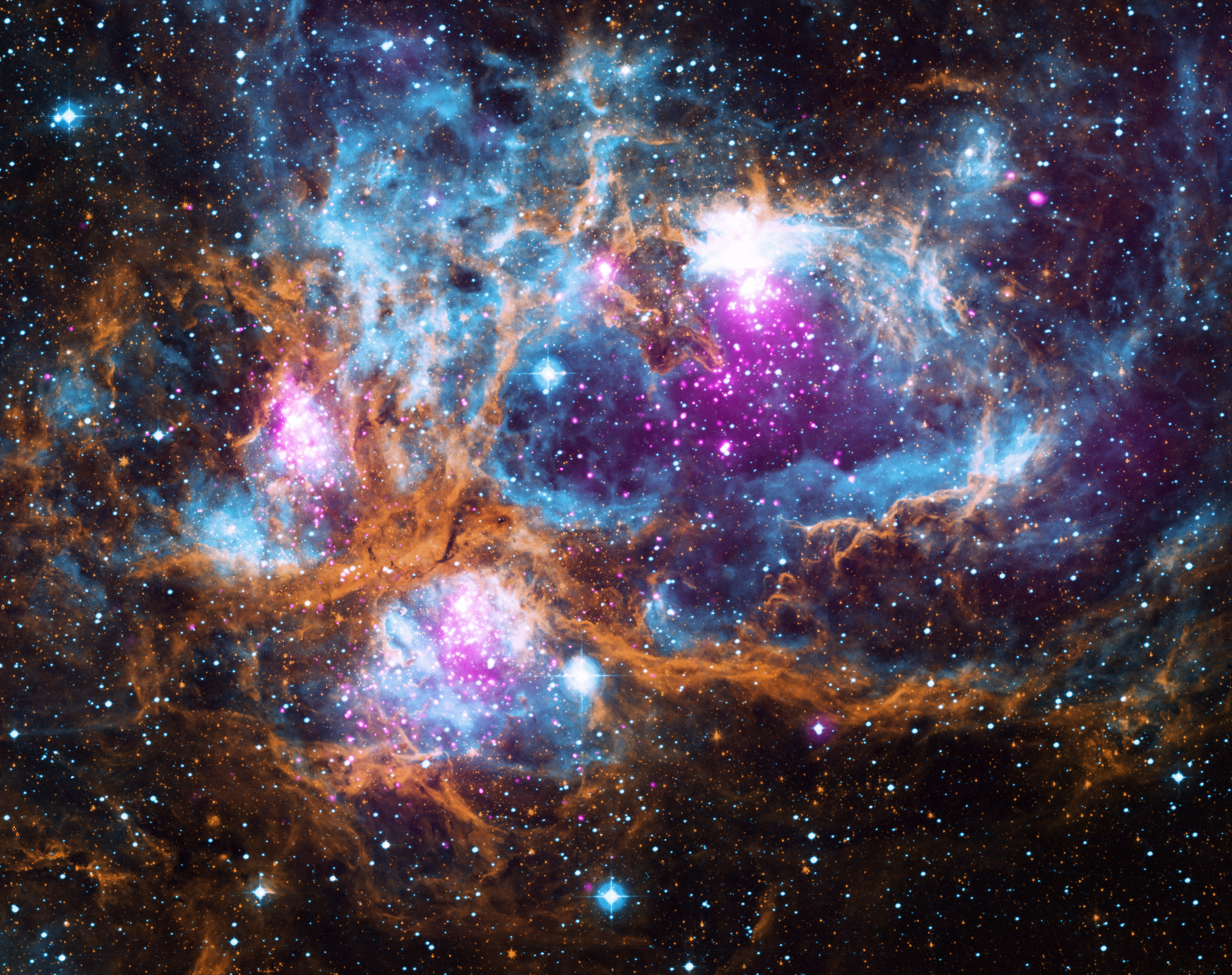
- NGC 6357 composite image

Observation data: J2000 epoch
- Right ascension: 17^{h} 24^{m}
- Declination: −34° 20′
- Distance: ~5900±450 ly (1800±140 pc)
- Constellation: Scorpius
- Designations: War and Peace Nebula, Lobster Nebula Sharpless 11, RCW 131, Gum 66, Madokami

NGC 6357 is a diffuse nebula near NGC 6334 in the constellation Scorpius. The nebula contains many proto-stars shielded by dark discs of gas, and young stars wrapped in expanding "cocoons" or expanding gases surrounding these small stars. It is also known as the Lobster Nebula. This nebula was given the name War and Peace Nebula by the Midcourse Space Experiment scientists because of its appearance, which, in infrared images the bright, western part resembles a dove, while the eastern part looks like a skull. A 2013 petition to rename it as the "Madokami Nebula", due to its resemblance to Madoka Kaname, received 19,000 signatures, though it was not successful.

It is located about 5,500 light years away from Earth. NGC 6357 is connected by a filamentary structure to NGC 6334, and the two may form a single complex.

== Associated open clusters ==
=== Pismis 24 ===
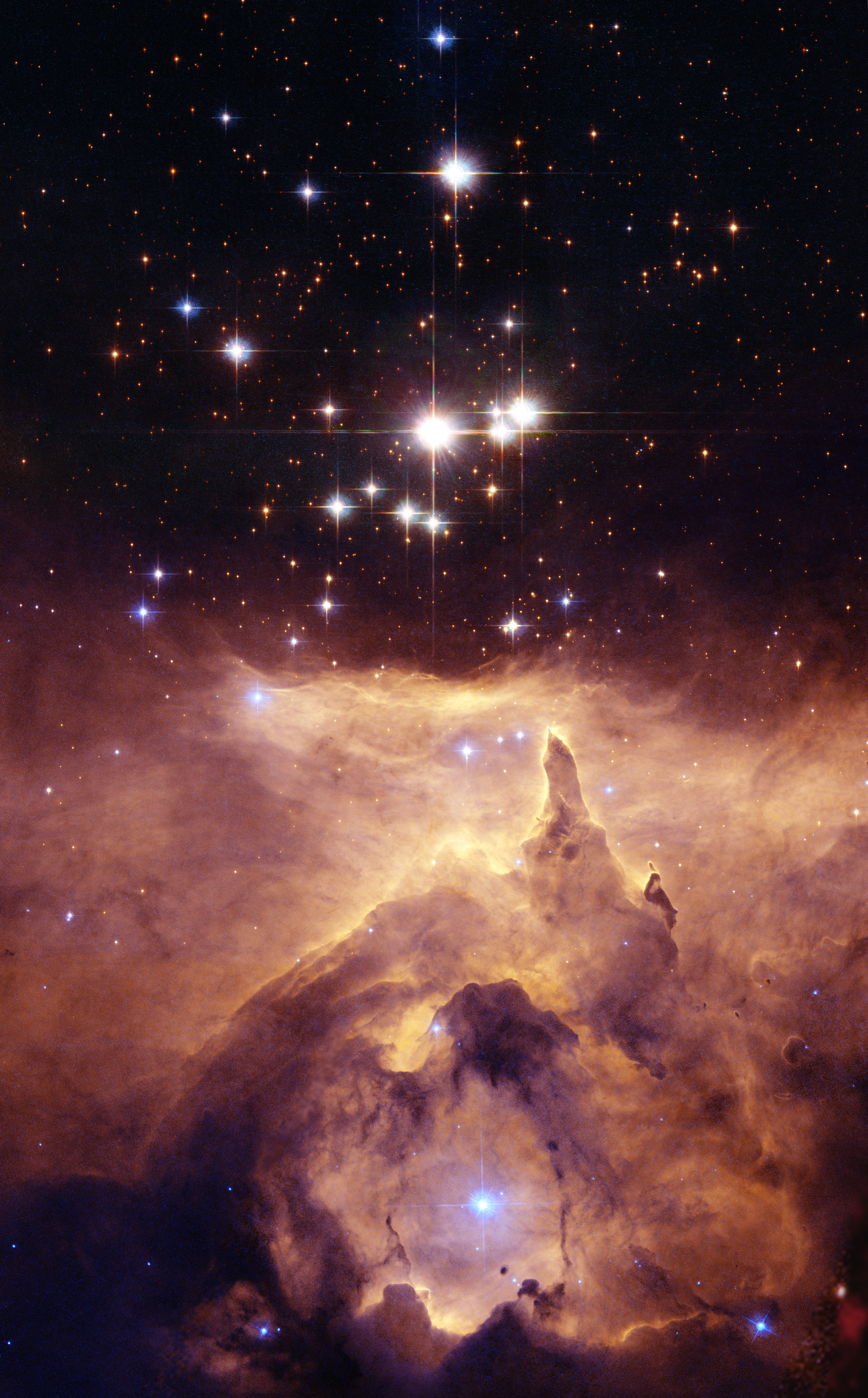
A Hubble Space Telescope (HST) image of Pismis 24-1, the "core" of NGC 6357.

Dark Energy Camera captures the star-forming nebula NGC 6357

This nebula includes the open cluster Pismis 24, which is home to several massive stars. One of the brightest stars in the cluster, Pismis 24-1, was thought possibly to be the most massive on record, approaching 300 solar masses, until it was discovered to be a multiple system of at least three stars; component stars would still remain near 100 solar masses each, making them among the more massive stars on record.

=== G353.2+0.7 ===
The young stellar cluster G353.2+0.7 lies east of Pismis 24 and was revealed by a Chandra X-ray image showing approximately 800 stars.

=== G353.1+0.6 ===
The young stellar cluster G353.1+0.6 lies southeast of Pismis 24 and also contains approximately 800 stars detected by X-ray. The region includes several O-type stars, including [BDSB2003] 10.

== Massive stars ==
NGC 6357 is one of the most prominent sites of massive-star formation in our neighborhood of the Milky Way. A variety of early O-type stars reside in this nebula, blowing the bubbles around the star clusters that can be seen in the molecular cloud.

Prominent stars in Pismis 24
| Star name | Spectral type | Magnitude (M_{bol}) | Temperature (K) | Radius (R_{☉}) | Mass (M_{☉}) |
|---|---|---|---|---|---|
| WR 93 (HD 157504) | WC7 | -11.2 | 71,000 | 10 | 120 |
| Pismis 24-1NE | O3.5 If^{*} | −10.0 | 42,000 | 17 | 74 |
| Pismis 24-1SW | O4 III | −9.8 | 41,500 | 16 | 66 |
| Pismis 24-2 | O5.5 V(f) | −8.9 | 40,000 | 12 | 43 |
| Pismis 24-3 | O8 V | −7.7 | 33,400 | 9 | 25 |
| Pismis 24-10 | O9 V | −7.2 | 31,500 | 8 | 20 |
| Pismis 24-12 | B1 V | −5.3 | 30,000 | 4 | 11 |
| Pismis 24-13 | O6.5 III((f)) | −8.6 | 35,600 | 12 | 35 |
| Pismis 24-15 | O8 V | −7.8 | 33,400 | 10 | 25 |
| Pismis 24-16 | O7.5 V | −9.0 | 34,000 | 16 | 38 |
| Pismis 24-17 | O3.5 III | −10.1 | 42,700 | 17 | 78 |
| Pismis 24-18 | B0.5 V | −6.4 | 30,000 | 6 | 15 |
| Pismis 24-19 | B0.5 V | −5.4 | 30,000 | 4 | 11 |

== See also ==
- List of most massive stars
- Sharpless Catalog
- RCW Catalogue
- Gum Catalog
