= RCW 136 =

Planetary Nebula

Nebula

Observation data: J2000 epoch
- Right ascension: 17^{h} 58^{m} 10^{s}
- Declination: −31° 42′ 55″
- Distance: 3200 pc
- Apparent magnitude (V): 17
- Apparent diameter: 1' x 1'
- Constellation: Sagittarius

Physical characteristics
- Radius: 8.1 ly
- Designations: IRAS 17549-3142, Haro 1-44, PN Sa 3-101, PN H 1-44, PN G358.9-03.7, SPICY 69710

RCW 136 is a planetary nebula on the border between Scorpius and Sagittarius. It was discovered by Guillermo Haro in 1952. It is located to the south of Baade's Window.
