= Sh 2-40 =

Molecular cloud

Sharpless 2-40
Nebula
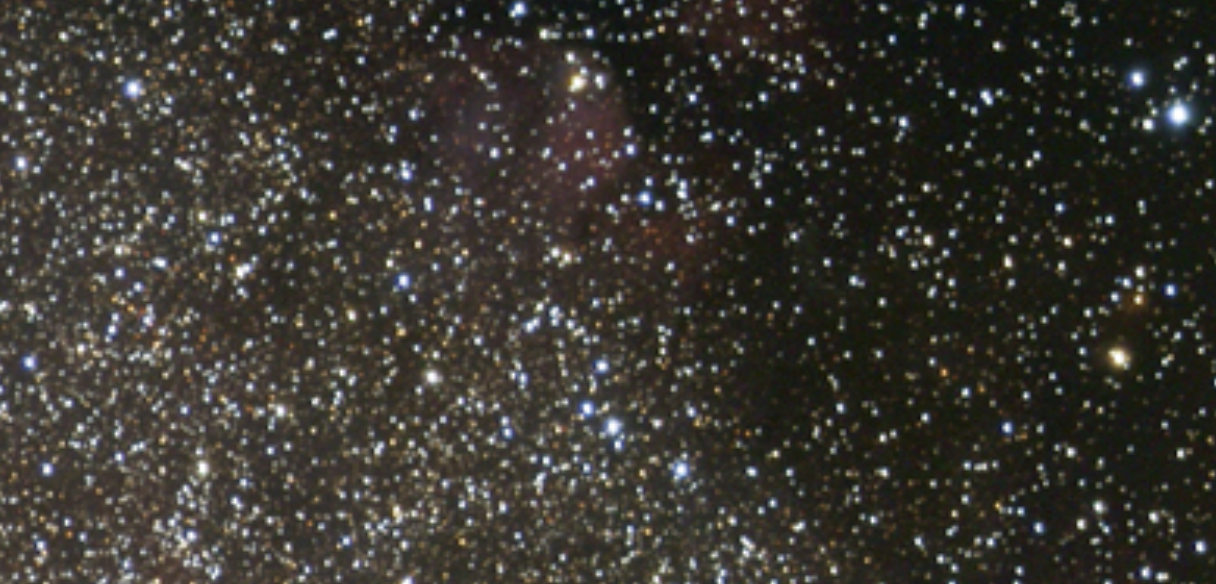
- Seen near the top

Observation data: J2000 epoch
- Right ascension: 18^{h} 12^{m} 10^{s}
- Declination: −17° 42′ 48″
- Apparent dimensions (V): 15' x 15'
- Constellation: Sagittarius

Physical characteristics
- Radius: 2400 pc
- Designations: RCW 155, LBN 49

Sh 2-40 is a large nebula in Sagittarius. It is just north of Sh 2-41. Sh 2-40 is in the same direction as powerful radio source W 33. W 33 is, however, about 4600 parsecs more distant than Sh 2-40.
