= RCW 34 =

Nebula in the constellation Vela

Emission nebula
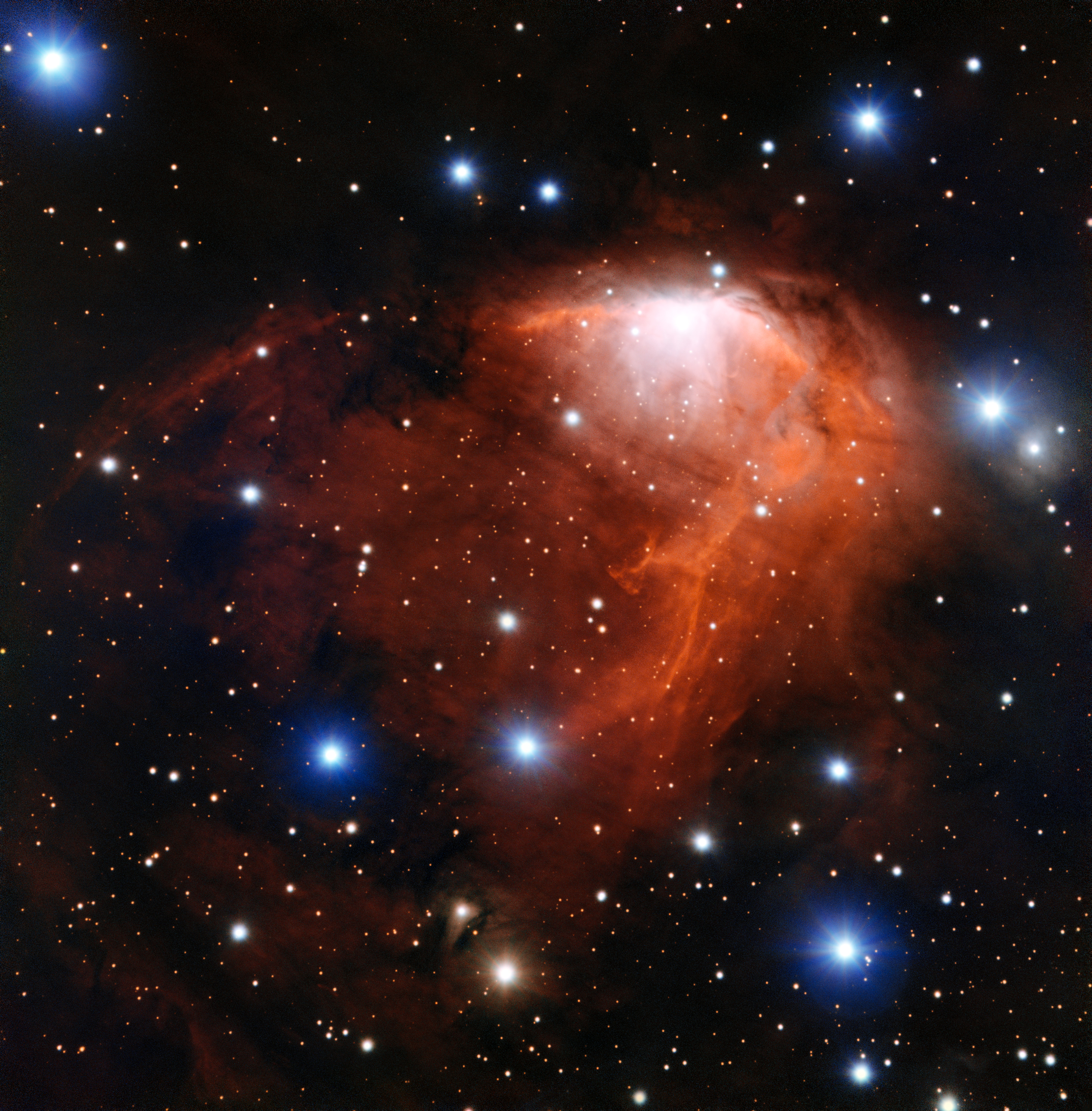
- RCW 34 (Gum 19) nebula in the constellation of Vela

Observation data: J2000 epoch
- Right ascension: 08^{h} 56^{m} 28.1^{s}
- Declination: −43° 05′ 58″
- Distance: 8200 ± 700 ly (2500 ± 200 pc)
- Apparent magnitude (V): 11.21
- Constellation: Vela (constellation)
- Designations: Gum 19, IRAS 08546-4254, VdBH 25

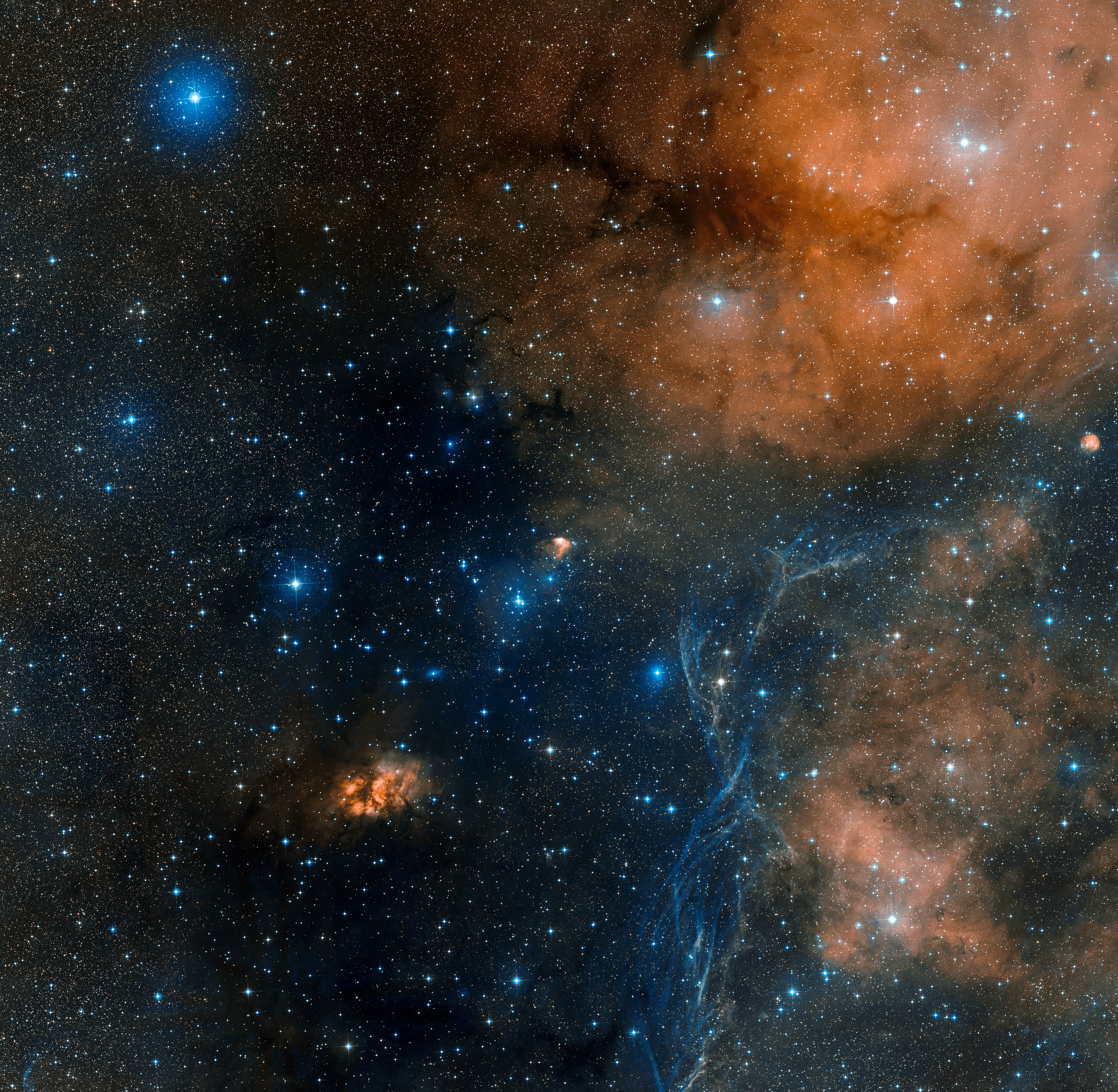
Around the star-formation region RCW 43 (Gum 19)

RCW 34 (Gum 19) - H II region and the emission nebula located in the constellation Vela. It is located approximately 8,200 light years from Earth. Named after Australian astronomer Colin Stanley Gum.

The nebula RCW 34 is relatively dark. However, when observed using infrared wavelengths, two different areas are visible - one half of the nebula is bright, and the other is dark. The bright side is the hydrogen illuminated by a nearby blue supergiant star, and dark is the place where new stars surround the central star on the other side.

The source of energy that stimulates the nebula RCW 34 to shine is a huge, extremely hot star V391 Velorum with a surface temperature of up to 30,000 °C. Because it is a variable star, it evokes violent phenomena, including discards of matter shells, affecting the composition and light emission of the RCW 34 nebula. Stars of the type V391 Velorum do not burn long enough to explode as supernovae. It can be expected that the explosion of the central star will completely change the RCW 34 nebula.
