= Sh 2-309 =

Molecular cloud

Sharpless 2-309
Nebula

Observation data: J2000 epoch
- Right ascension: 07^{h} 31^{m} 48^{s}
- Declination: −19° 26′ 05″
- Distance: 4000 pc
- Apparent magnitude (V): 15.87
- Apparent dimensions (V): 12'
- Constellation: Puppis

Physical characteristics
- Radius: 48 ly
- Designations: BRAN 42A, RCW 13, LBN 1053

Sh 2-309 is a nebula in Puppis. The nebula contains the infrared cluster [DBS2003] 9. It is located beyond the Carina Arm. Sh 2-308 is ionized by the star cluster Bochum 9. Bochum 9 contains about 30 members.
