= NGC 6334 =

Emission nebula in the constellation Scorpius

Emission nebula
- Near-infrared image of the Cat’s Paw Nebula from the James Webb Space Telescope.

Observation data: J2000 epoch
- Right ascension: 17^{h} 20^{m} 50.9^{s}
- Declination: −36° 06′ 54″
- Distance: 4,370 ± 650 ly (1,340±200 pc)
- Apparent dimensions (V): 35′ × 20′
- Constellation: Scorpius

Physical characteristics
- Radius: ~35 ly ly
- Designations: Cat's Paw Nebula, NGC 6334, Gum 64, RCW 127, ESO 392-EN 009, Sharpless 8

NGC 6334 is a massive emission nebula and star-forming region located in the constellation Scorpius. It is colloquially known as the Cat's Paw Nebula, and can be found 3° to the west-northwest of the bright star Lambda Scorpii. NGC 6334 was discovered by English astronomer John Herschel on June 7, 1837, who observed it from the Cape of Good Hope in South Africa. It spans an angular area larger than the full Moon. This structure is located in the Carina–Sagittarius Arm of the Milky Way, at a distance of approximately 5.5 thousand light-years from the Sun.

This nebula is a high mass filamentary cloud structure spanning about 70 ly. In the visible part of the spectrum, NGC 6334 emits mainly in red (from hydrogen atoms) and blue (from oxygen atoms). The interior is heavily obscured by interstellar dust, with clumps ranging up to 3,000 M_{☉} in mass. Although there is pervasive star formation throughout, several embedded star-forming regions have been identified from infrared and radio emissions. Four of these sites have formed H II regions. X-ray sources within the nebula show the presence of ten distinct stellar clusters, most of which are associated with already identified infrared sources and H II regions.

NGC 6334 is connected by a filamentary structure to NGC 6357, and the two may form a single complex.

== 2025 James Webb Telescope discoveries ==
In July of 2025, astrophysicists using the James Webb Space Telescope reported views of a stellar nursery within what they humorously call the "toe beans," the large, circular structures resembling the soft pads on the bottom of cats' paws. The team achieved a close-up of a red-orange oval toe bean within which veiled stars are beginning to shine, including one that produced a visible shockwave when it ejected gas and dust at high speeds. The NASA press report begins:

It's the cat's meow! To celebrate its third year of revealing stunning scenes of the cosmos in infrared light, NASA's James Webb Space Telescope has "clawed" back the thick, dusty layers of a section within the Cat's Paw Nebula (NGC 6334). Focusing Webb's NIRCam (Near-Infrared Camera) on a single "toe bean" within this active star-forming region revealed a subset of mini toe beans, which appear to contain young stars shaping the surrounding gas and dust.

The NASA press release also reported on the dust-filled nebular section known as the "Opera House" and other toe beans where, despite intense radiation, dust filaments may be dense enough to form protostars.

== Gallery ==
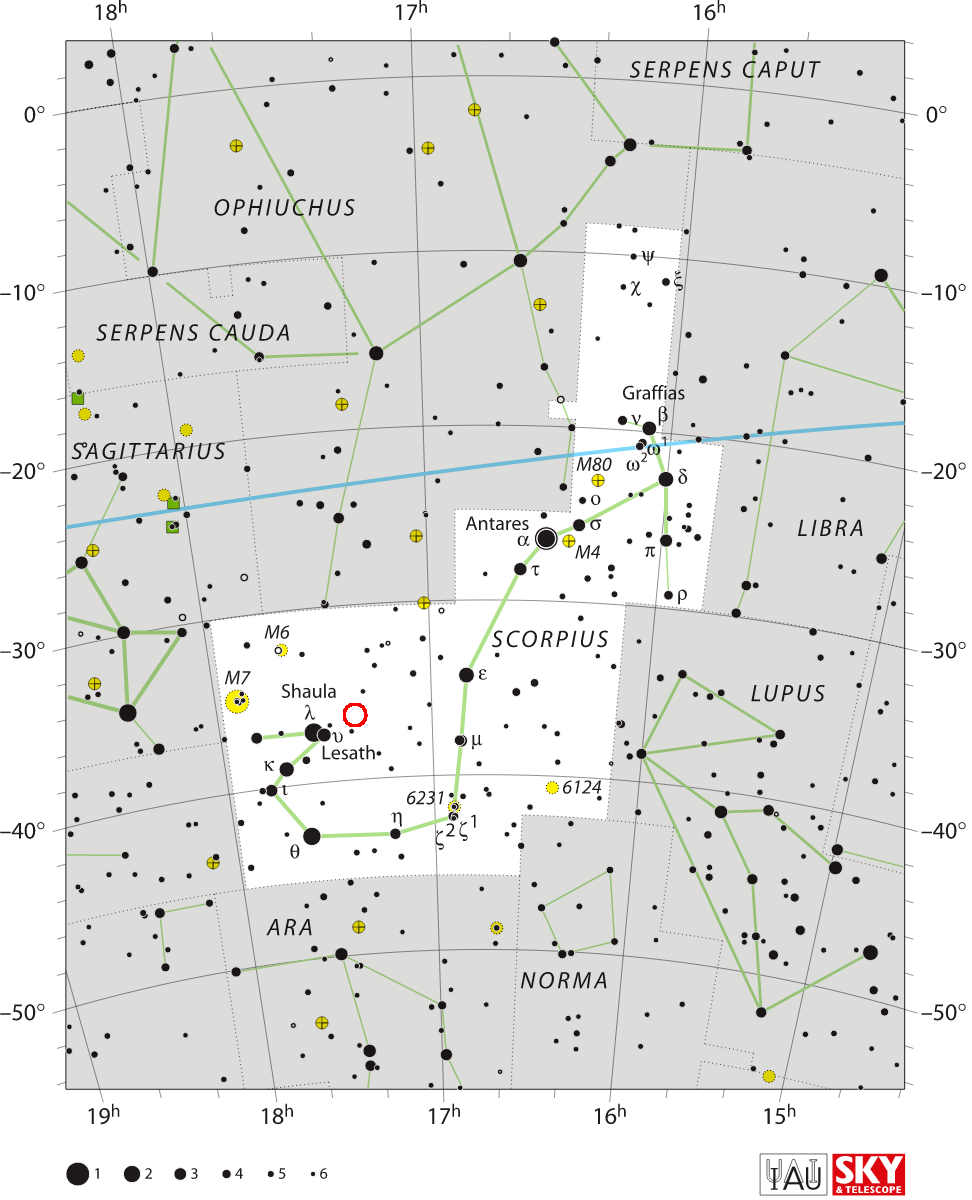
The location of NGC 6334 (circled in red)

Infrared view of NGC 6334

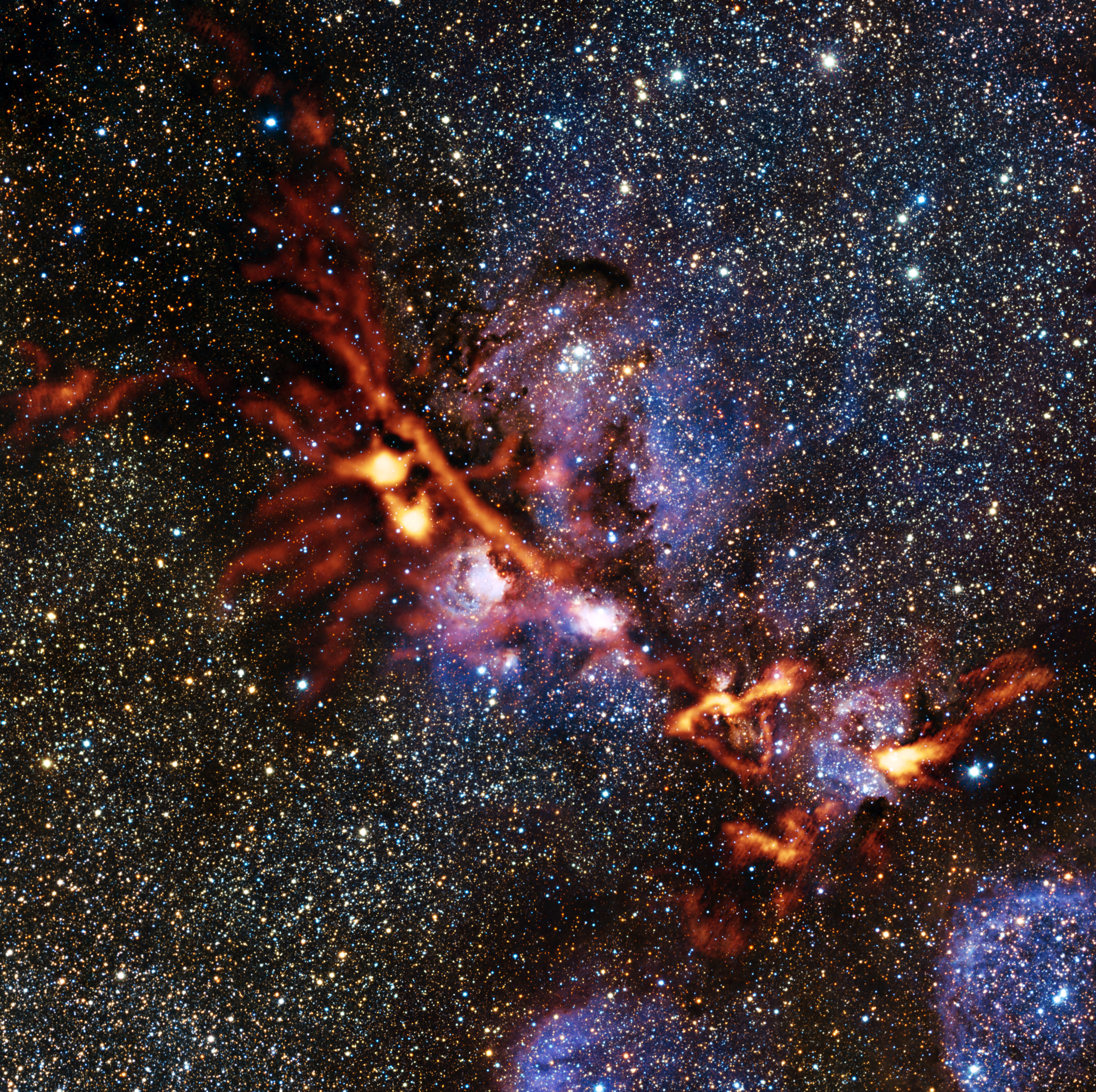
Submillimetre views of the star formation region

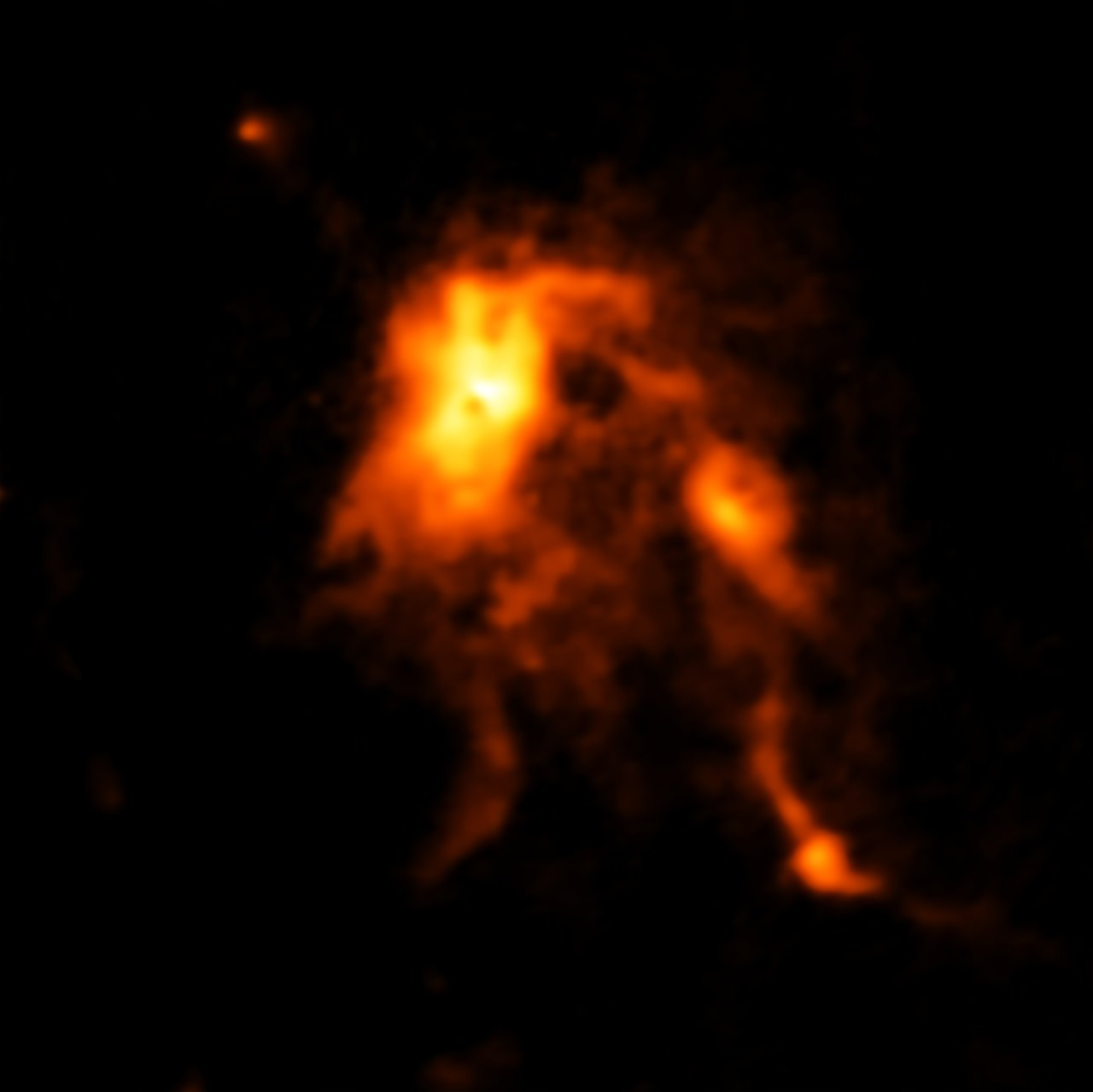
Star-forming cloud in the Cat's Paw Nebula.

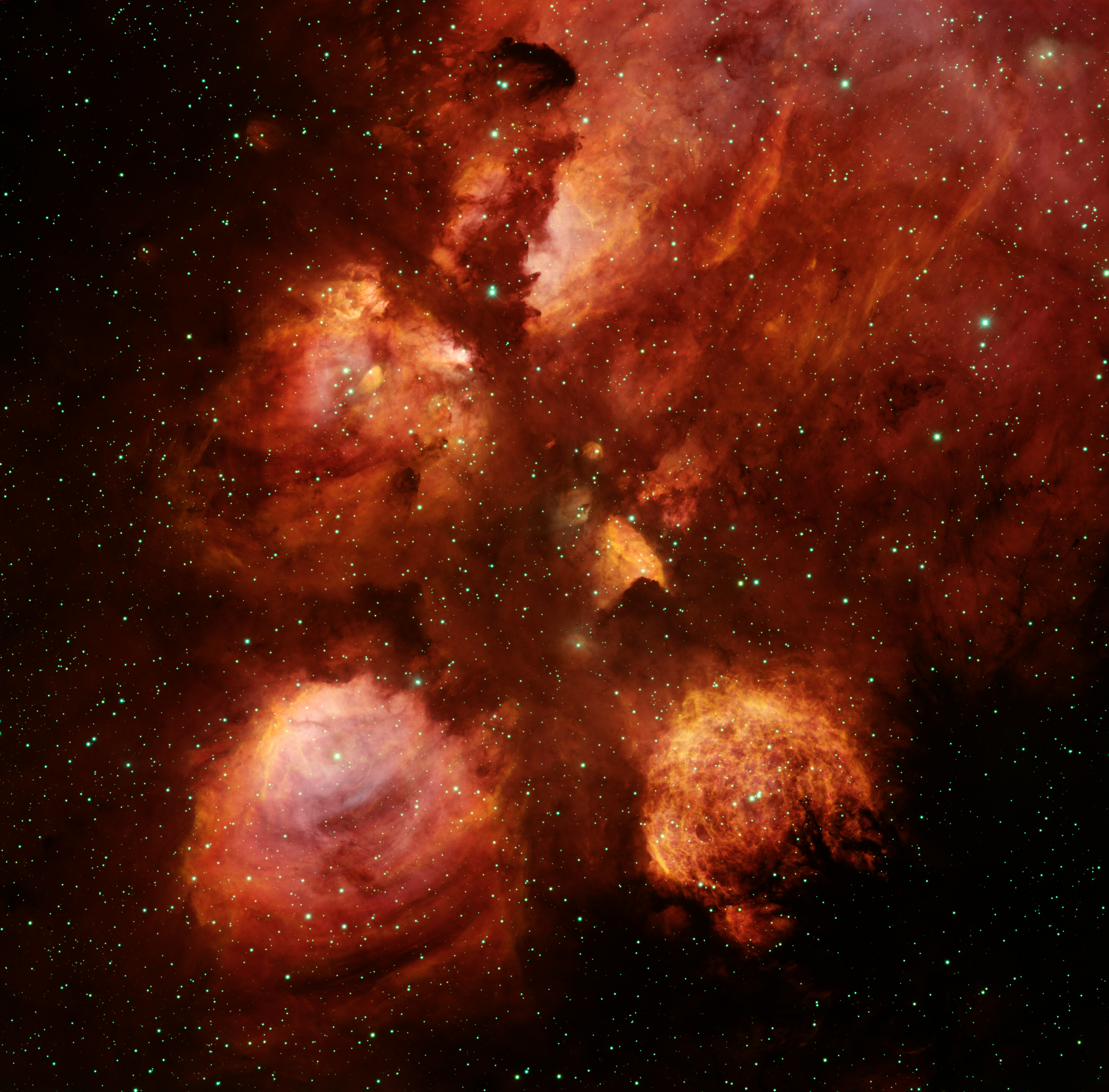
Taken in 2007 using the Mosaic-2 imager on the Blanco 4-meter telescope at Cerro Tololo Inter-American Observatory.
