= Cometary knot =

Structure in some planetary nebulae

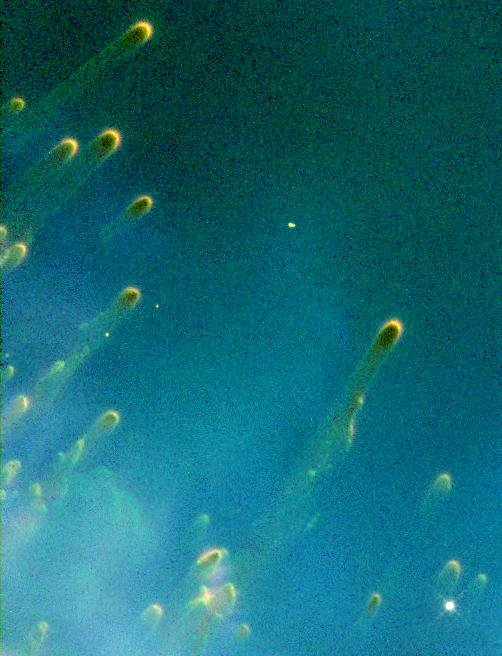
Cometary knots in the Helix Nebula

Cometary knots, also referred as globules, are structures observed in several nearby planetary nebulae (PNe), including the Helix Nebula (NGC 7293), the Ring Nebula (NGC 6720), the Dumbbell Nebula (NGC 6853), the Eskimo Nebula (NGC 2392), and the Retina Nebula (IC 4406). They are believed to be a common feature of the evolution of planetary nebulae, but can only be resolved in the nearest examples. They are generally larger than the size of the Solar System (i.e. the orbit of Pluto), with masses of around 0.00001 times the mass of the Sun, which is comparable to the mass of the Earth. There are about 40,000 cometary knots in the Helix Nebula.

At optical wavelengths, the knots are seen as "the ionized skin of a dense, dusty molecular globule" forming a crescent-shaped head that is ionized and illuminated by the central star, with a trailing spoke or tail. In molecular hydrogen and carbon monoxide data, the tails of cometary knots are observed to be highly molecular. The central globule is at least 1000 times denser than the surrounding material that streams past it. The appearance is analogous to the tail of a comet that faces away from its star, but comets are solid bodies and much smaller in overall size and mass.

Globules located far and close to the central star present different characteristics. On the near side of the Helix Nebula, the central dusty globule of each cometary knot appears dark against the background as it absorbs the [O III] 5007 Angstrom light emitted in the nebular envelope. Those on the far side do not obstruct this light source and so do not have this dark appearance. In addition, globules near the central star appear to have a distinct trailing tail, whereas those located farther do no exhibit such defined tails.

The origin of cometary knots in planetary nebulae is still unknown and subject to active research. It is unclear whether they were created during the Asymptotic Giant Branch (AGB) phase and somehow managed to survive the AGB-PN transition, or if they were created when the star has already become a planetary nebula. The latter case would imply that the conditions in the planetary nebula host would have, at a certain point, triggered the formation of molecular clumps in its nebular envelope. Therefore, understanding the formation and evolution of cometary knots would not only give an insight into the physical properties of the planetary nebula host, but would also help draw a more detailed picture of the stellar evolution of low to intermediate mass stars.

== Relation to other photoevaporation flows ==
Cometary knots are one type of ionized photoevaporation flow, which is characteristically associated with planetary nebulae, but several other types of photoevaporation flows (proplyds, cometary globules, elephant trunks, and champagne flows) are known from H II regions such as the Orion Nebula. Cometary knots are described as more advection-dominated than the other varieties, which are recombination-dominated or dust-dominated. The distinction can be made in terms of the formula for the "dynamic ionization balance within a photoevaporation flow", F_{*} ≈ μn_{0} + αn_{0}^{2}h. Here F_{*} is the "ionizing photon flux incident on the outside of the flow", μ is the "initial velocity of the flow", α is the "recombination coefficient", n_{0} is the "peak ionized density in the flow", and h, which is approximately 0.1 r_{0}, is the "effective thickness of the flow". In advection-dominated flows, μn_{0} is greater than αn_{0}^{2}h, and most of the incoming photons reach the ionization front and ionize fresh gas. In other flows, most photons fail to reach the ionization front, and instead balance recombinations in the flow.

== Reports in more distant objects ==
Several structures have been described as cometary knots or cometary globules that surround R Coronae Borealis, which is a peculiar star described as potentially the result of a white dwarf merger or final helium shell flash that periodically dims due to a build-up of carbon dust surrounding it, acting as a 'natural coronograph'.

Three-dimensional modelling of NGC 6337, a planetary nebula with a close binary nucleus, suggests the presence of a "thick ring with radial filaments and knots." The cometary knots represent large density fluctuations in a slowly expanding toroid.

== Gallery ==
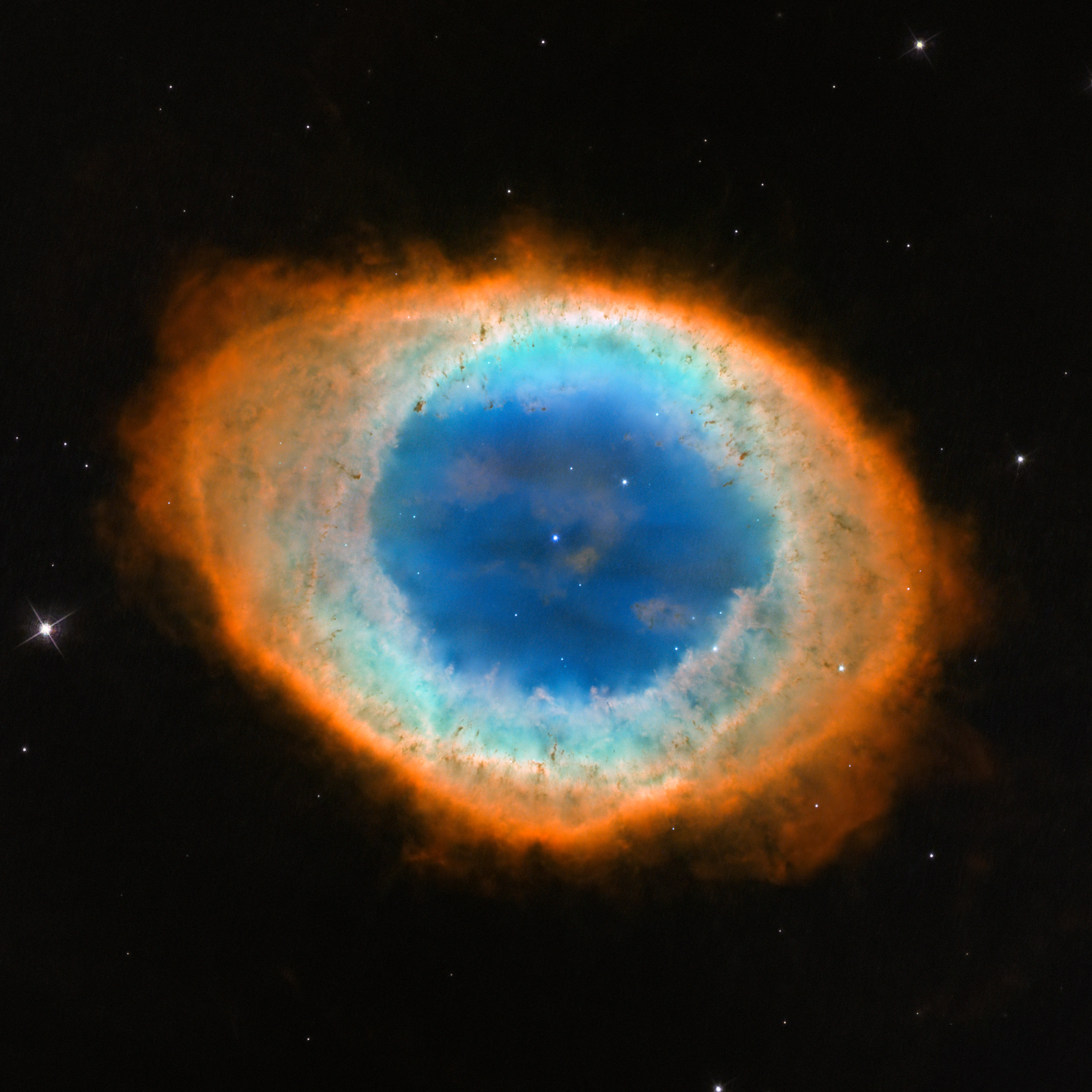
Ring Nebula

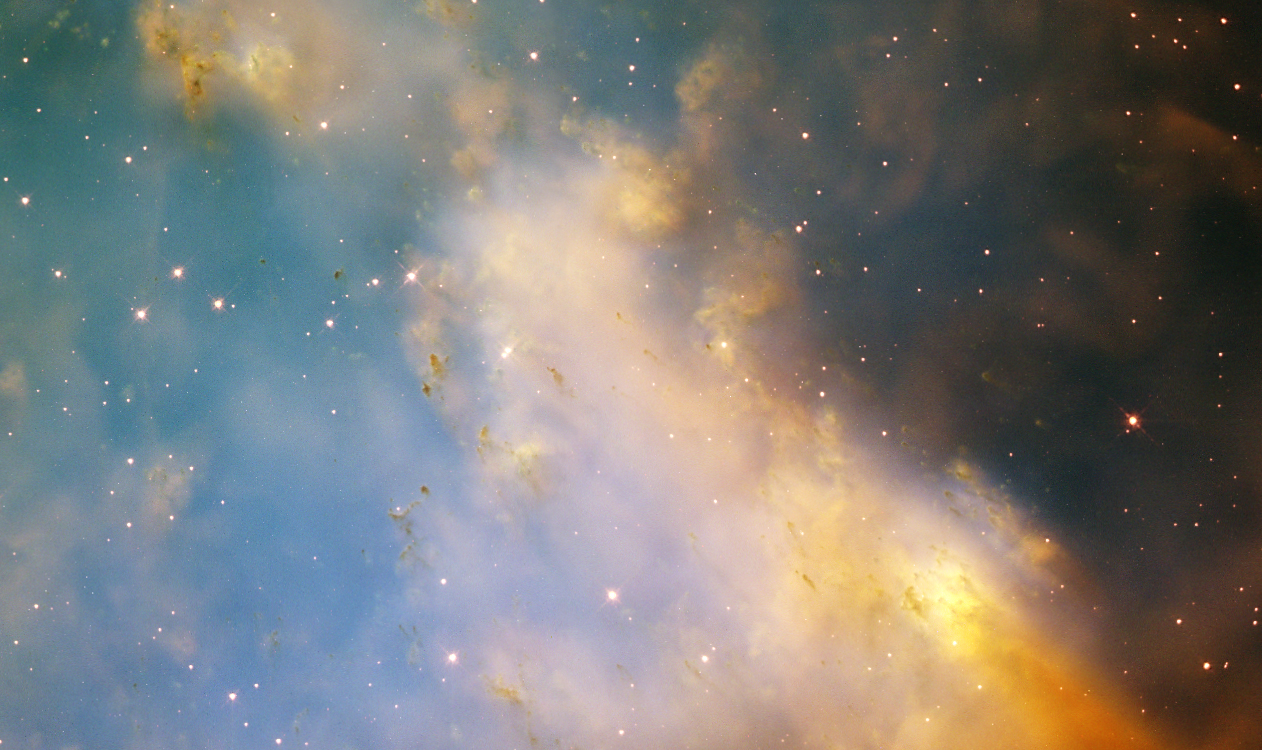
Knots in the Dumbbell Nebula

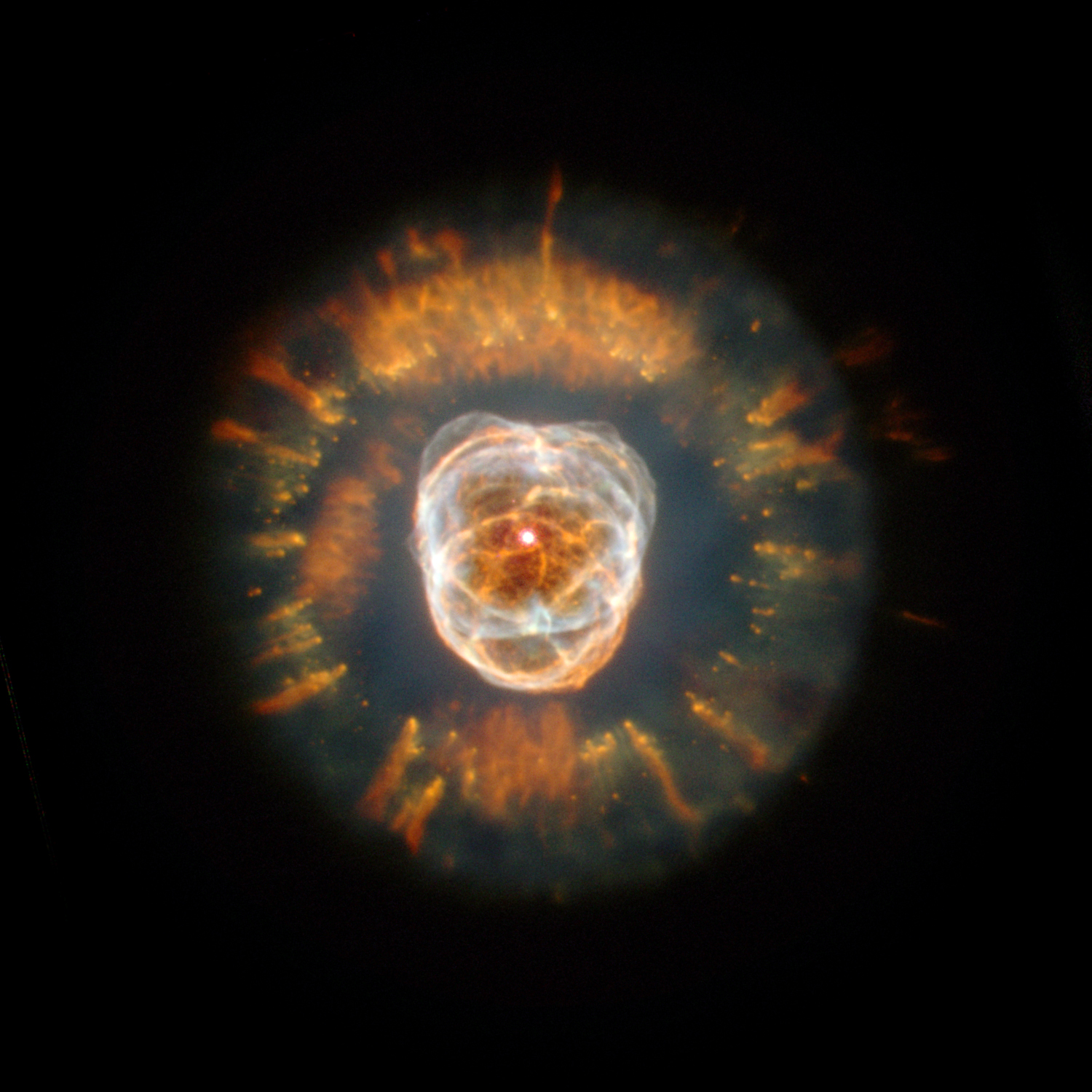
Eskimo Nebula
