= Cheerio =

Cheerio or Cheerios may refer to:

- Cheerios, a breakfast cereal with a number of variations
- Cheerio (company), a Japanese soft drink company
  - Cheerio (drink), a Japanese soft drink
- Cheerio Meredith (1890–1964), American character actress
- Charles K. Field, eponymous host of the radio program Cheerio
- "Cheerio", a 1983 no. 1 Norwegian hit song by The Monroes (Norwegian band)
- "Cheerio", a track from the 1982 album The Broadsword and the Beast by the rock band Jethro Tull
- Cheerios, a cheerleading squad on the television series Glee
- A small version of a saveloy in New Zealand and Queensland, also called a cocktail sausage
- NGC 6337, a planetary nebula sometimes called the Ghostly Cheerio or Cheerio Nebula
- A saying for goodbye in the UK

== See also ==
- Cheerios effect, an effect in fluid dynamics
