= Sh 2-5 =

Emission nebula

Sharpless 2-5
Emission nebula
- H II region

Observation data: epoch
- Right ascension: 17^{h} 20^{m} 13^{s}
- Declination: −38° 29′ 03″
- Distance: 8,800 ly (2,700 pc)
- Apparent magnitude (V): 15.6
- Apparent dimensions (V): 100'
- Constellation: Scorpius
- Designations: RCW 123, Gum 59, IRAS 17167-3826

Sh 2-5 is an emission nebula in the constellation Scorpius. It is part of the Sharpless Catalog assembled by Stewart Sharpless. It is contained within the much larger War and Peace Nebula, listed in the Sharpless catalog as Sh 2-11, and Sh 2-5 itself contains NGC 6337.

Like the nearby Sh 2-4, Sh 2-5 is probably ionized by the nearby star cluster Havlen-Moffat 1. However, it is also possible that ionization may be caused by nearer stars in the Sagittarius Arm.

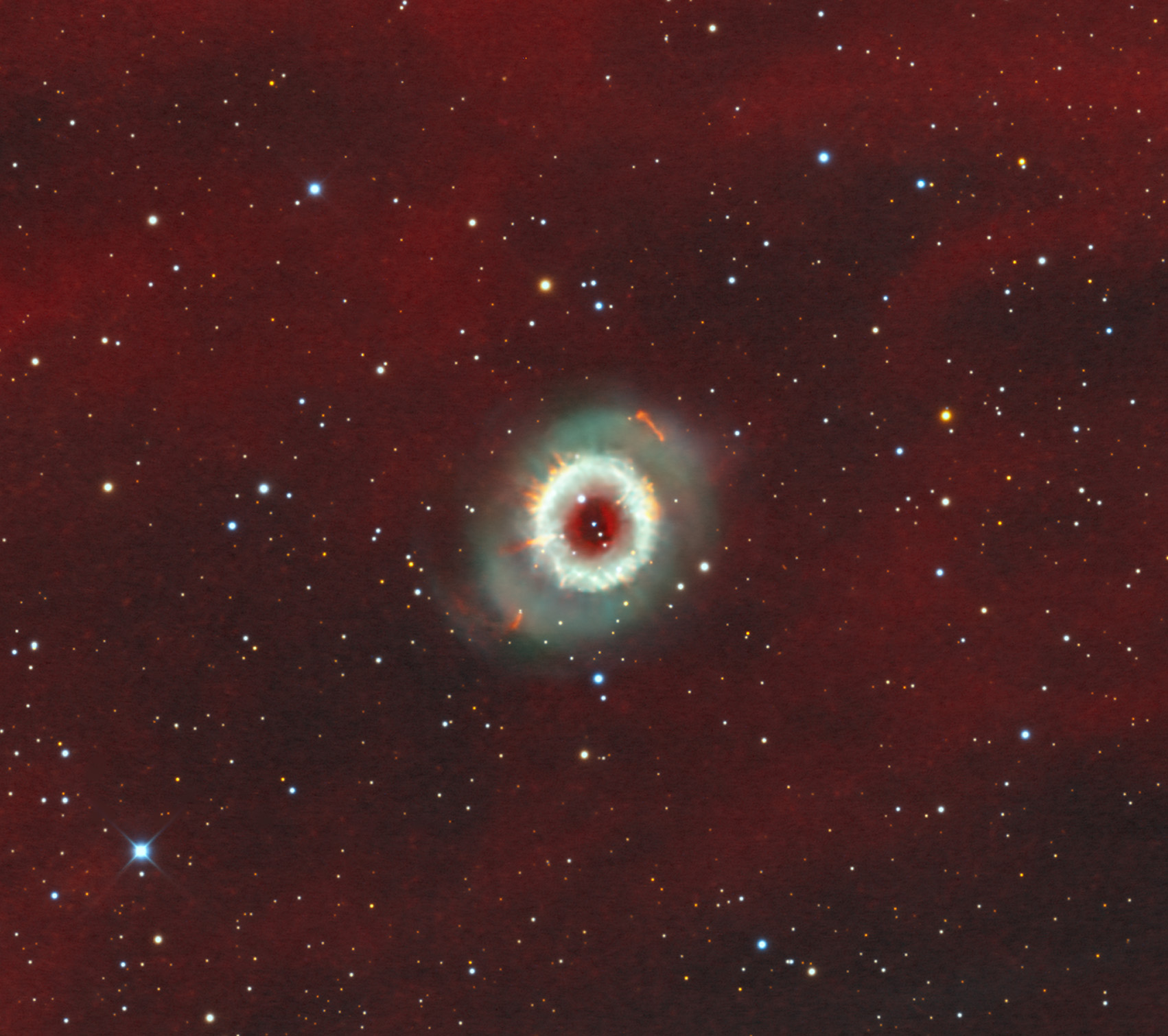
NGC 6337 within the nebula. The red nebulosity is part of Sh 2-5.
