= LSS 4067 =

O-type blue supergiant star

Observation data Epoch J2000 Equinox ICRS
- Constellation: Scorpius
- Right ascension: 17^{h} 19^{m} 05.548^{s}
- Declination: −29° 43′ 41.20″
- Apparent magnitude (V): 11.44

Characteristics
- Spectral type: O4.5Ifpe
- U−B color index: +0.37
- B−V color index: +1.49
- V−R color index: +1.28

Astrometry
| Radial velocity (R_{v}) | −51.0 km/s |
| Proper motion (μ) | RA: −2.5 mas/yr Dec.: −6.6 mas/yr |
| Distance | 9,500–12,700 ly (2,900–3,900 pc) |
| Absolute magnitude (M_{V}) | −6.335 |

Details
| Mass | 120 M_{☉} |
| Radius | 18.65 R_{☉} |
| Luminosity | 802,000 L_{☉} |
| Surface gravity (log g) | 3.61 cgs |
| Temperature | 40,000 K |
| Rotational velocity (v sin i) | <107 km/s |
| Age | 1.10 Myr |

Other designations
- LS 4067, CD−38°11748, Hen 3-1374, HM 1 VB 4, TYC 7870-896-1, 2MASS J17190554-3848496

Database references
| SIMBAD | data |

LSS 4067, also known as CD−38°11748, is an O-type blue supergiant star located in the constellation Scorpius, very close to the galactic plane. It is part of the open cluster HM 1, although its distance is not well known; it may be anywhere between 9,500 and 12,700 light years (2900 to 3900 parsecs) away from the Earth. Despite being a blue supergiant, it is extremely reddened by interstellar extinction, so its apparent magnitude is brighter for longer-wavelength passbands. Without the extinction, it is estimated that LS 4067 would be 5.8 magnitudes brighter, a naked eye star with an apparent magnitude of 5.3.

Although the Gaia Data Release 2 parallax for LS 4067 is negative, a likely distance can be calculated from it. The star is thought to be between 8,202 and 14,084 pc away, statistically most likely at 10,170 pc. It was catalogued as a member of the faint cluster Havlen-Moffat No. 1, but is no longer thought to be a member. The cluster lies about 3,300 pc.

LSS 4067 has an absolute bolometric magnitude of −11.4, making it one of the most luminous stars known. Indeed, many of the hottest and most luminous stars known are O-type supergiants, or Wolf-Rayet stars. LSS 4067 has an unusual spectrum, with various emission lines including N III and He II emission lines, thus the "f" in its spectral type. Because of this unusual spectrum, classifying the star or deducing its properties has proved relatively difficult: for example, the effective temperature is predicted to be too cool and the surface gravity too high.

== See also ==
- List of most luminous stars
- List of most massive stars
