= HM 1 =

Open cluster in the constellation Scorpius

HM 1 (Havlen-Moffat 1)
- Approximate location of HM 1 (circled)

Observation data (J2000 epoch)
- Right ascension: 17^{h} 18^{m} 54^{s}
- Declination: −38° 49′ 01″
- Distance: 9,500–12,700 ly (2,900–3,900 pc)
- Apparent dimensions (V): 5′

Physical characteristics
- Estimated age: 1–2 Myr; 2–4 Myr
- Star cluster rich in massive stars
- Other designations: C 1715-387

Associations
- Constellation: Scorpius

HM 1, also known as Havlen-Moffat 1, is an open cluster located in the constellation of Scorpius, close to the galactic plane. It was first observed by R. J. Havlen and A. F. J. Moffat in 1976. HM 1 is thought to be 9,500 to 12,700 light-years (2,900 to 3,900 parsecs) away from the Earth, beyond the Carina–Sagittarius Arm. It is heavily reddened by interstellar extinction, so although it comprises mostly blue-colored stars, it appears brighter for longer-wavelength passbands. It is projected against the H II region known as RCW 121, and appears to be the source of ionization for the nearby regions RCW 122 and RCW 123.

== Properties ==
The extinction value for HM 1 is calculated to be E_{B−V} = 1.85 magnitudes, and its distance was first estimated to be around 2.9 ± 0.4 kiloparsecs away. Later estimates put the cluster at around 3.3 kiloparsecs away; this is still one of the more closer massive star clusters.

HM 1 is fairly young for an open cluster; it is estimated to be 1 to 2, or 2 to 4 million years old. This is indicated by the presence of Of stars, which have relatively short lives. However, a red supergiant with a bolometric magnitude of −6.6 and a mass of about 20 M_{☉} was discovered near the cluster, contradicting the supposed age of the cluster. However, subsequent work showed the star is likely in the foreground.

== Composition ==
HM 1 is noted for its components, including several Wolf–Rayet stars and Of stars. Both types of stars are fairly rare and very massive, and their coexistence in star clusters was unexpected. The evolution of Wolf–Rayet stars and Of stars in star clusters is currently unclear. Very few Wolf–Rayet stars have been found in star clusters, and a possible explanation is that the formation of these cluster Wolf–Rayet stars requires a binary star system containing two Of stars. Alternatively, cluster Wolf–Rayet stars may simply be rare because they represent a short stage in the evolution of Of stars, whether single or binary.

Many of the stellar components are extremely blue-colored O-type stars that are among some of the most luminous stars known. Some of the candidate members listed have masses of over 20 M_{☉}, making this cluster one of the richest known. Examples include the peculiar star LSS 4067, an O-type supergiant with a spectral type of O4If+. WR 89, another luminous star, is a strong X-ray source and is possibly a colliding-wind binary, based on data from XMM-Newton. In contrast, WR 87 has a high plasma temperature consistent with that of a colliding-wind binary but otherwise appears to be a single star (similar to WR 136).

Properties of HM 1 cluster members
Name (Note: These numbers are not the same as the ones used in SIMBAD. For example, HM 1 6 (WR 87) is [NRS2013] HM1 6, not Cl HM 1 6.)	T_{eff}	M_{V}	M_{bol}	Mass (M_{☉})	Spectral type	Ref.
HM 1 1 (WR 89)	39800	−7.56	−11.09	87	WN8h	
HM 1 2 (LSS 4067)	47800	−7.0	−11.4	120	O4If+	
HM 1 3 (WR 87)	44700	−6.95	−10.79	59	WN7h	
HM 1 6	45000	−6.5	−10.7	95	O5If	
HM 1 8 (Note: This is a binary star system. Parameters, if two are provided, refer to the primary and secondary, respectively.)	41200 + 34500	−5.2 + −3.7	−10	26.8 + <9.7	O4.5IV(f) + O9.7V	
HM 1 9	37900	−5.3	−8.9	38		
HM 1 12	41900	−5.5	−9.5	50	O6If	
HM 1 13	41000	−5.3	−9.2	44	O7V((f))	
HM 1 16	33100	−5.4	−8.7	32		
HM 1 18	38100	−4.4	−8.1	29		
HM 1 19	39300	−4.1	−7.8	28		
HM 1 20	34700	−4.1	−7.4	22	O9.5V	

== Gallery ==
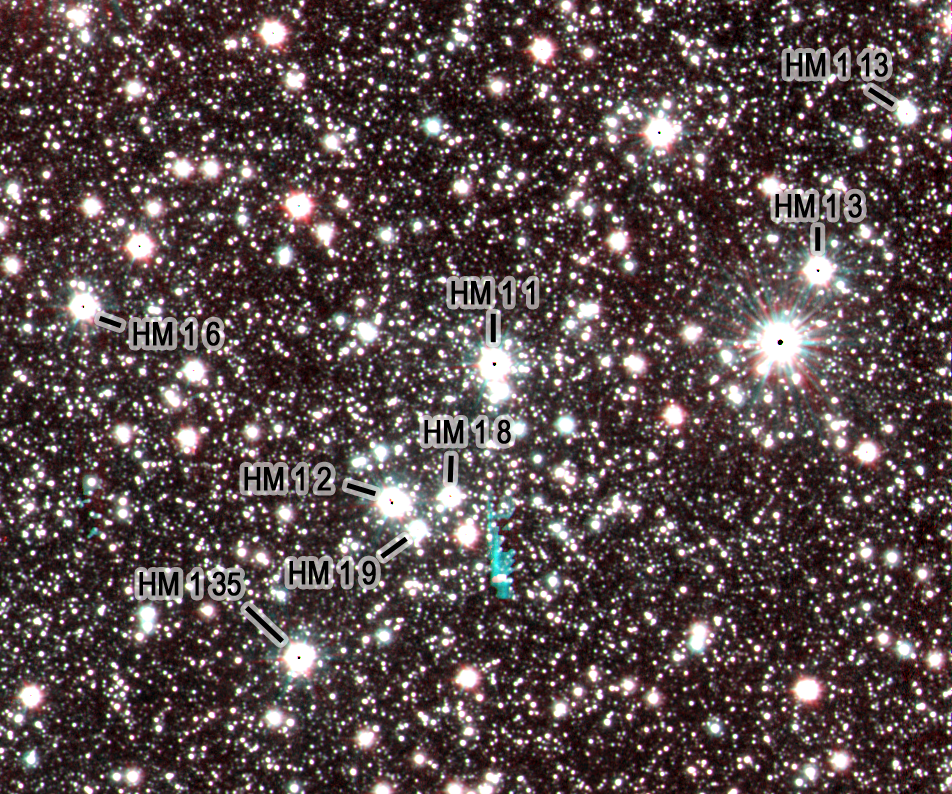
Near-Infrared image of HM1 taken with ESO's VISTA. Some cluster members are marked.

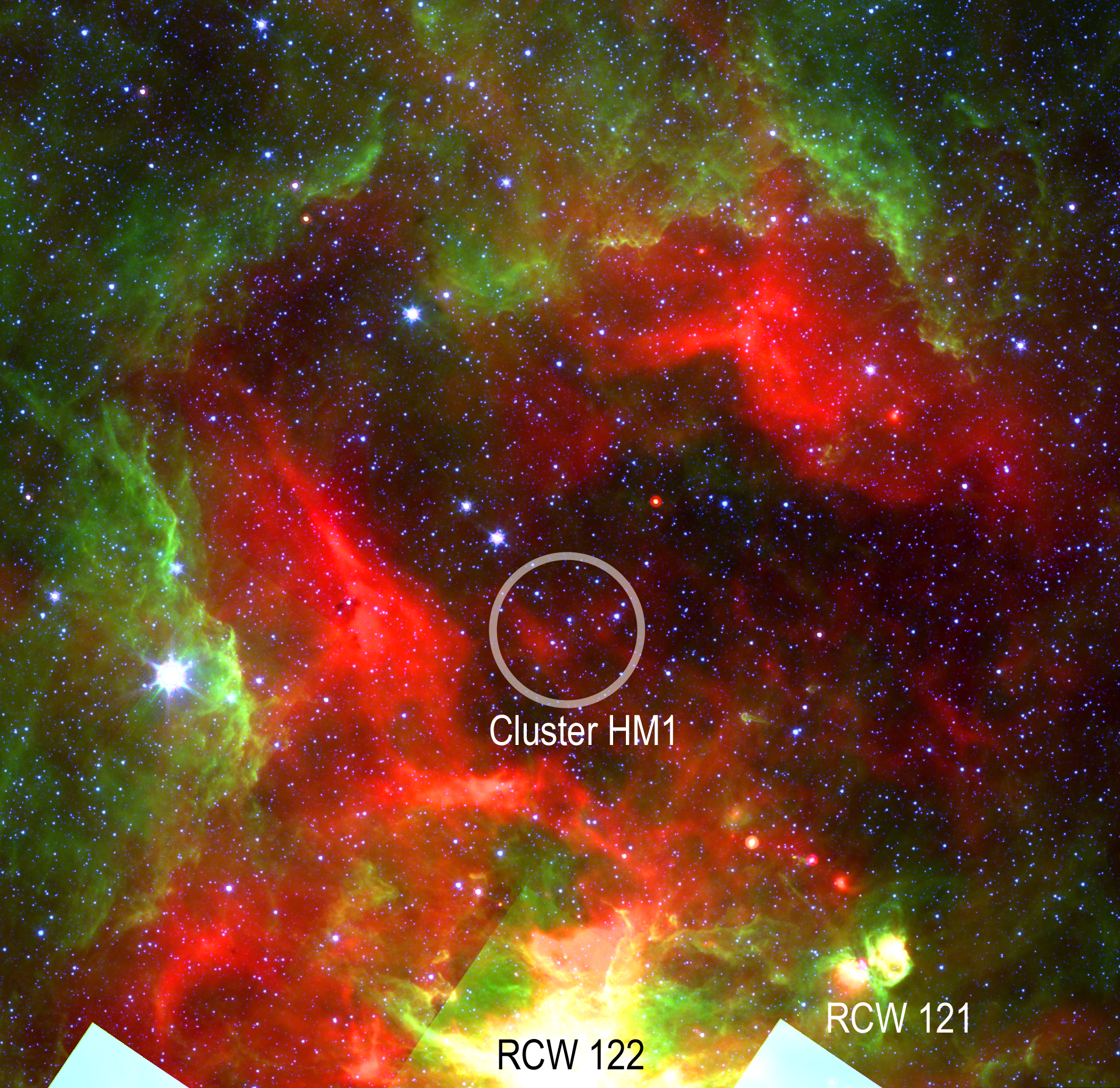
Spitzer mid-infrared view of the environment of the cluster, including RCW 121 and RCW 122 at the bottom.

== See also ==
- Cygnus OB2, an OB association containing many massive stars
- List of most massive stars
