= 14 Vulpeculae =

Star in the constellation Vulpecula

- 14 Vul in the constellation Vulpecula (circled)

Observation data Epoch J2000 Equinox J2000
- Constellation: Vulpecula
- Right ascension: 19^{h} 59^{m} 10.5367^{s}
- Declination: +23° 06′ 04.604″
- Apparent magnitude (V): 5.68

Characteristics
- Evolutionary stage: main sequence
- Spectral type: F1 Vn
- B−V color index: 0.345±0.004

Astrometry
Radial velocity (R_{v})	−38.0±3.7 km/s
Proper motion (μ)	RA: −68.157±0.100 mas/yr Dec.: 6.926±0.125 mas/yr
Parallax (π)	18.7753±0.1714 mas
Distance	174 ± 2 ly (53.3 ± 0.5 pc)
Absolute magnitude (M_{V})	2.23

Details
Mass	1.52 M_{☉}
Luminosity	11.09 L_{☉}
Surface gravity (log g)	3.81±0.14 cgs
Temperature	6,938±236 K
Metallicity [Fe/H]	−0.36 dex
Rotational velocity (v sin i)	150 km/s
Age	1.743 Gyr

Other designations
- 14 Vul, BD+22° 3872, HD 189410, HIP 98375, HR 7641, SAO 88016

Database references
SIMBAD	data

14 Vulpeculae is a single, yellow-white hued star in the northern constellation of Vulpecula and proximate to the Dumbbell Nebula (M 27) on the celestial sphere, although actually much closer to the Earth. It is a dim star that is faintly visible to the naked eye with an apparent visual magnitude of 5.68. The distance to 14 Vul, as determined from its annual parallax shift of 18.7753±0.1714, is around 174 light years. It is moving nearer with a heliocentric radial velocity of about −38 km/s, and will make its closest approach in a million years when comes to within about 62 ly (19.04 pc).

This is an F-type main-sequence star with a stellar classification of F1 Vn, where the 'n' notation indicates nebulous lines due to rapid rotation. At the estimated age of 1.7 billion years old, it is spinning with a projected rotational velocity of 150 km/s and has sub-solar metallicity. The star has 1.5 times the mass of the Sun and is radiating 11 times the Sun's luminosity from its photosphere at an effective temperature of about 6,938 K.
