= Helix Nebula =

Planetary nebula in the constellation Aquarius

Helix Nebula, NGC 7293
Emission nebula
- Planetary nebula
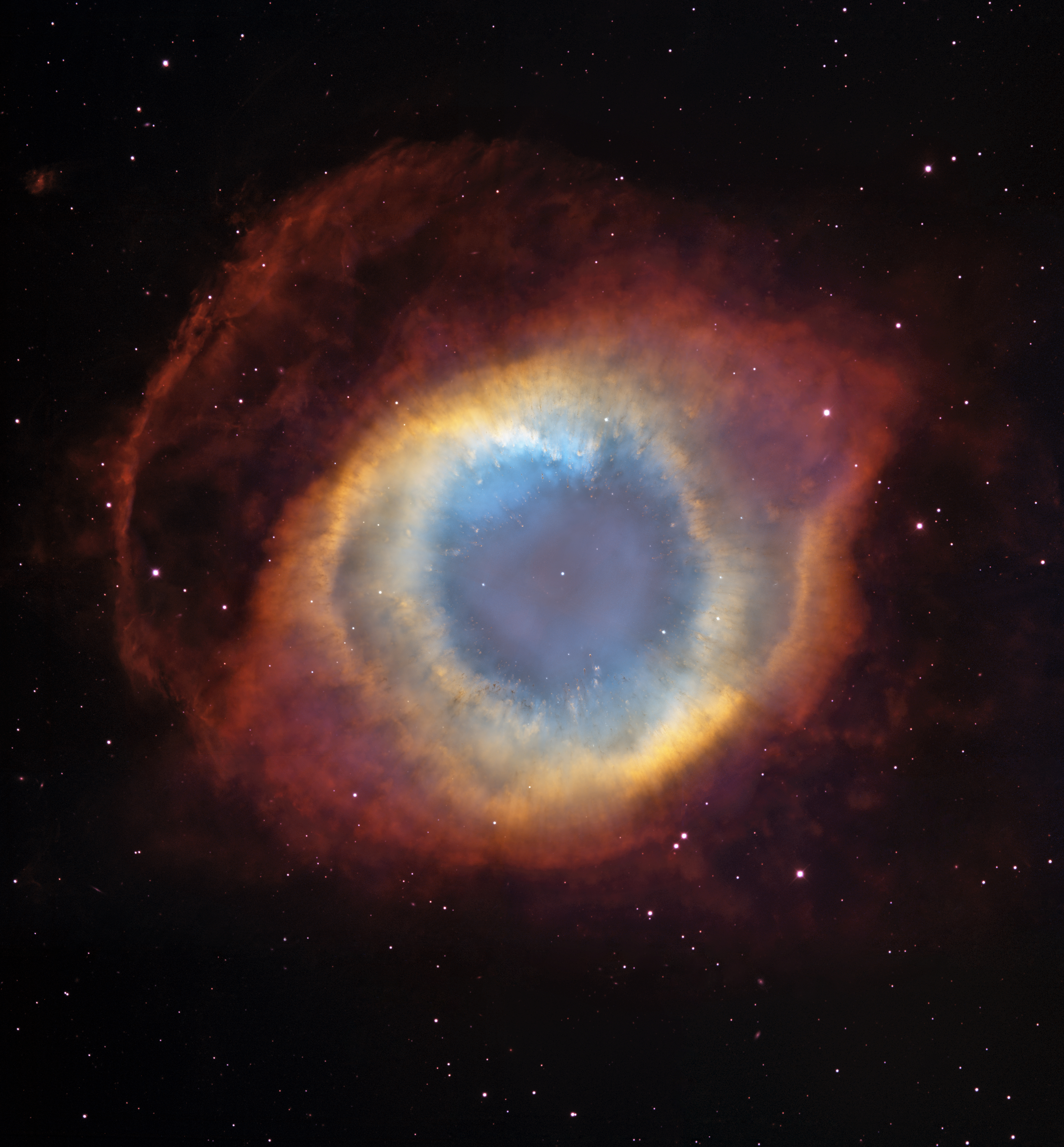
- NGC 7293 seen through several visible filters by Hubble Space Telescope

Observation data: J2000 epoch
- Right ascension: 22^{h} 29^{m} 38.55^{s}
- Declination: −20° 50′ 13.6″
- Distance: (200±1 pc) 650±3 ly
- Apparent magnitude (V): +7.6
- Apparent dimensions (V): 25′
- Constellation: Aquarius

Physical characteristics
- Radius: 2.87 ly (0.88 pc) ly
- Notable features: One of the nearest PNe
- Designations: NGC 7293 Caldwell 63

The Helix Nebula (also known as NGC 7293 or Caldwell 63) is a planetary nebula (PN) located in the constellation Aquarius. Discovered by Karl Ludwig Harding, most likely before 1824, this object is one of the closest to Earth of all the bright planetary nebulae. The distance, measured by the Gaia mission, is 655±13 light-years. It is similar in appearance to the Cat's Eye Nebula and the Ring Nebula, whose size, age, and physical characteristics are in turn similar to the Dumbbell Nebula, differing only in their relative proximity and the appearance from the equatorial viewing angle. The Helix Nebula has sometimes been referred to as the "Eye of God" in pop culture, as well as the "Eye of Sauron".

== General information ==
The Helix Nebula is an example of a planetary nebula, formed by an intermediate to low-mass star, which sheds its outer layers near the end of its evolution. Gases from the star in the surrounding space appear, from Earth's perspective, a helix structure. The remnant central stellar core, known as the central star (CS) of the planetary nebula, is destined to become a white dwarf star. The observed glow of the central star is so energetic that it causes the previously expelled gases to brightly fluoresce.

The nebula is in the constellation of Aquarius, and lies about 650 light-years away, spanning about 0.8 parsecs (2.5 light-years). Its age is estimated to be 10600+2300
−1200 years, based on the ratio of its size to its measured expansion rate of 31 km·s^{−1}.

== Structure ==
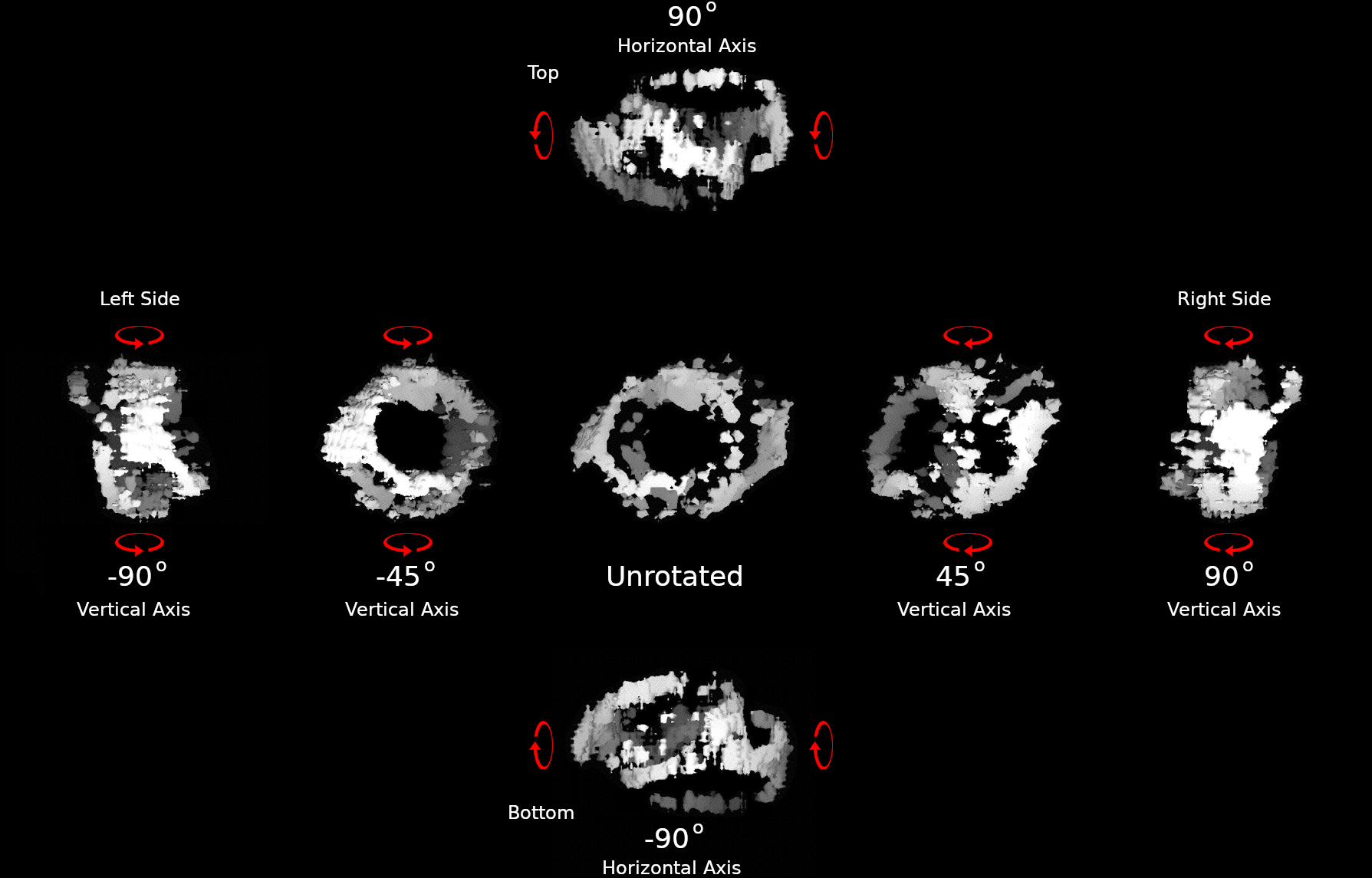
A 3 dimensional map of carbon monoxide in NGC 7293

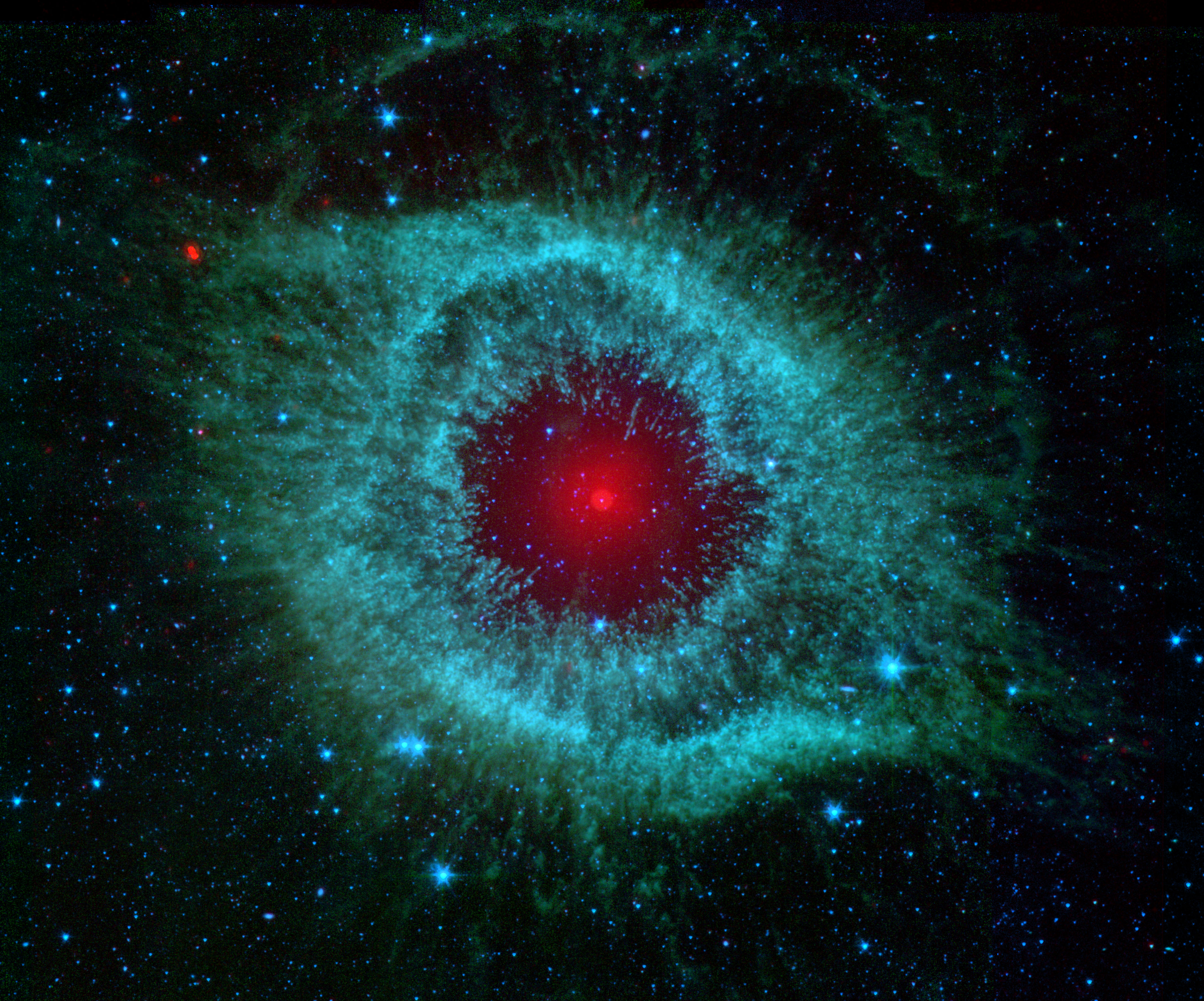
Structure and cometary knots are prominent in this Infrared false-color image taken by the Spitzer Space Telescope

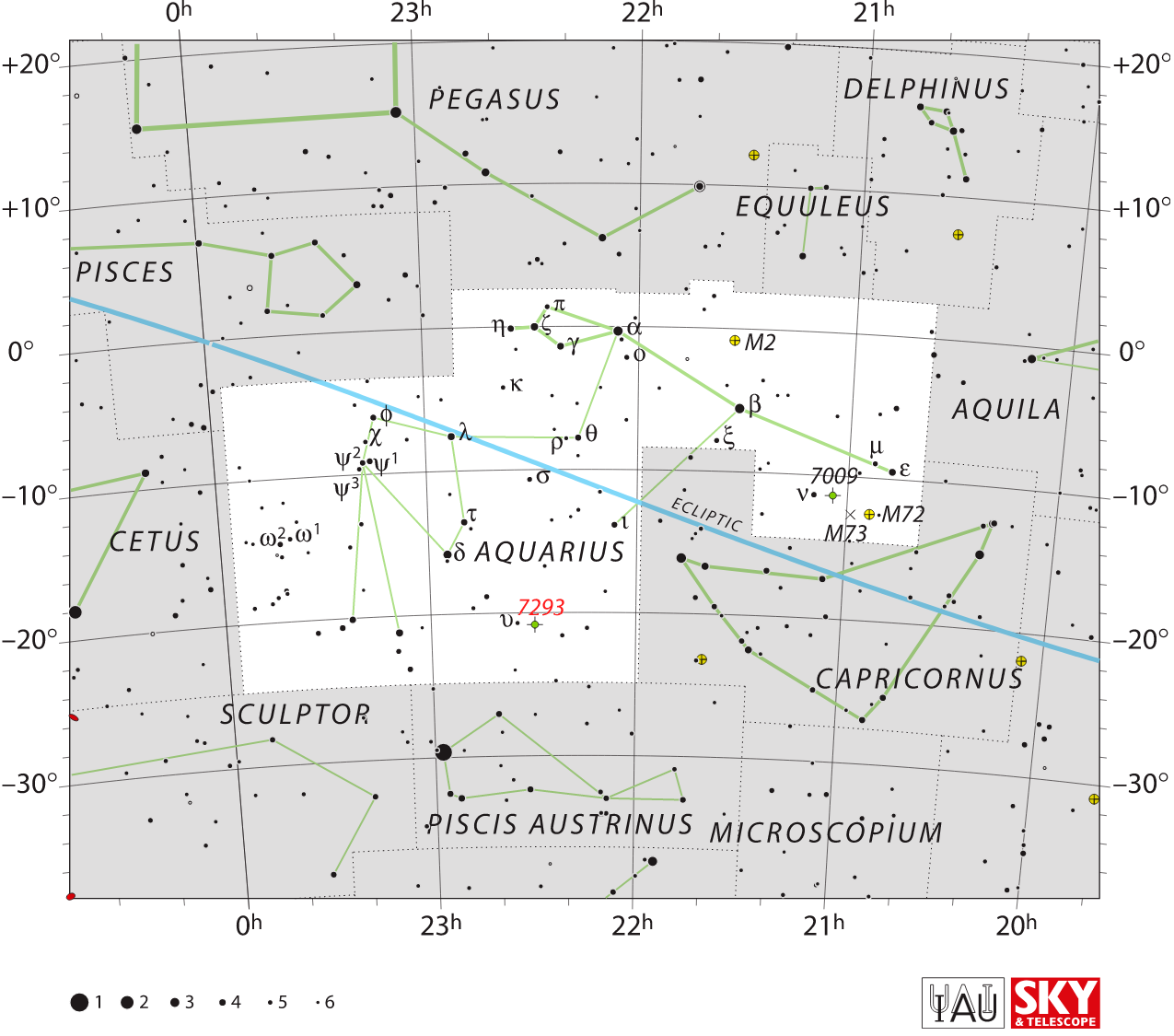
The location of NGC 7293 (labelled in red)

The Helix Nebula is thought to be shaped like a prolate spheroid with strong density concentrations toward the filled disk along the equatorial plane, whose major axis is inclined about 21° to 37° from our vantage point. The size of the inner disk is 8×19 arcmin in diameter (0.52 pc); the outer torus is 12×22 arcmin in diameter (0.77 pc); and the outer-most ring is about 25 arcmin in diameter (1.76 pc). The outer-most ring appears flattened on one side due to it colliding with the ambient interstellar medium.

Expansion of the whole planetary nebula structure is estimated to have occurred in the last 12,100 years, and 6,560 years for the inner disk. Spectroscopically, the inner disk's expansion rate is 40 km/s, and about 32 km/s for the outer ring.

=== Knots ===
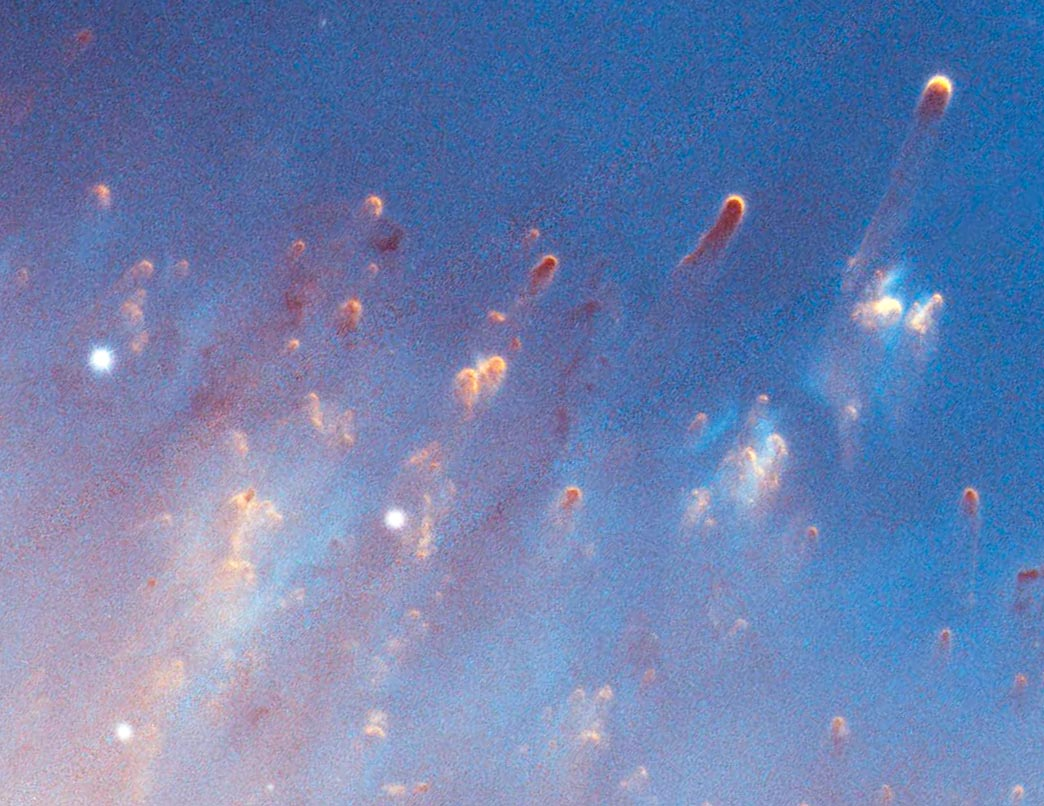
A closer view of knots in the nebula

The Helix Nebula was the first planetary nebula discovered to contain cometary knots. Its main ring contains knots of nebulosity, which have now been detected in several nearby planetary nebulae, especially those with a molecular envelope like the Ring nebula and the Dumbbell Nebula.

These knots are radially symmetrical (from the CS) and are described as "cometary", each centered on a core of neutral molecular gas and containing bright local photoionization fronts or cusps towards the central star and tails away from it. All tails extend away from the Planetary Nebula Nucleus (PNN) in a radial direction. Excluding the tails, each knot is approximately the size of the Solar System, while each of the cusp knots are optically thick due to Lyc photons from the CS. There are about 40,000 cometary knots in the Helix Nebula.

The knots are probably the result of Rayleigh-Taylor instability. The low density, high expansion velocity ionized inner nebula is accelerating the denser, slowly expanding, largely neutral material which had been shed earlier when the star was on the Asymptotic Giant Branch.

The excitation temperature varies across the Helix Nebula. The rotational-vibrational temperature ranges from 1800 K in a cometary knot located in the inner region of the nebula are about 2.5'(arcmin) from the CS, and is calculated at about 900 K in the outer region at the distance of 5.6'.

== Central star ==
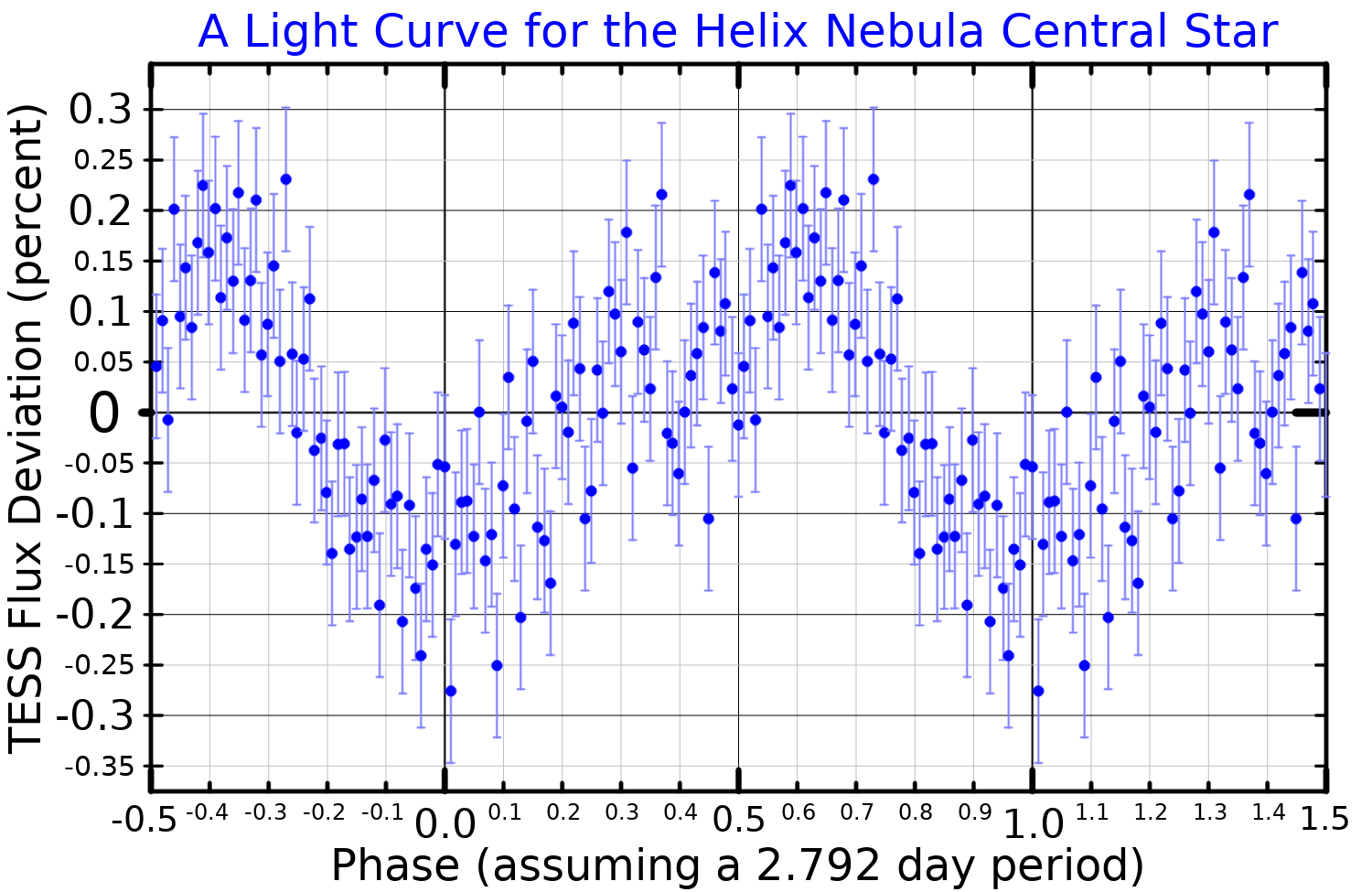
A light curve for the Helix Nebula central star, adapted from Iskandarli et al. (2024)

The central star of the Helix Nebula is a white dwarf of spectral type DAO. It has the designations WD 2226-210, PHL 287, and GJ 9785. The star has a radius of 0.025 solar radii (17,000 km), a mass of 0.678 M_{☉}, a temperature of 120,000 Kelvin and has an apparent magnitude of 13.5.

A mid-infrared excess suggest a disk with a size of 35 to 150 AU, formed from Kuiper-belt like objects. The size was later revised to be a ring between 30 and 100 AU. The non-detection at longer wavelengths allowed a research team to reject a series of scenarios. The researchers think the mid-IR excess comes from a replenishment of dust particles from thousands of exocomets at high eccentricities, with an origin from an Oort cloud-like structure.

A 2024 study hypothesized that the central star might be orbited by a planet based on periodic variations in its light curve, but it cannot be ruled out that these variations are due to intrinsic stellar variability. Assuming an inclination of 25° (aligned with the nebula itself), this hypothetical planet is estimated to have a radius of 0.021 solar radii (15,000 km), or about 2.3 times the radius of Earth.

Another study from 2025 found from X-ray observation that the central star may be accreting the remains of a Jupiter-like planet. This would be closer than the planet found via optical variability.

The Helix Nebula planetary system
Companion (in order from star)	Mass	Semimajor axis (AU)	Orbital period (days)	Eccentricity	Inclination (°)	Radius
c (unconfirmed)	1 M_{J}	0.004	0.12	—	—	—
b (unconfirmed)	—	0.034	2.79	—	~25?°	~2.3? R_{🜨}
debris disk	30–100 AU				—	—

== Videos ==
This zoom sequence starts with a wide-field view of the rather empty region of sky around the constellation of Aquarius.

This video compares a new view of the Helix Nebula acquired with the VISTA telescope in infrared light with the more familiar view in visible light from the MPG/ESO 2.2-metre telescope at ESO's La Silla Observatory.

A 3D model of the Helix Nebula from the Galaxy Map app (iOS/Android)

== See also ==
- New General Catalogue (NGC)
