= Cheerio (drink) =

Japanese carbonated soft drink

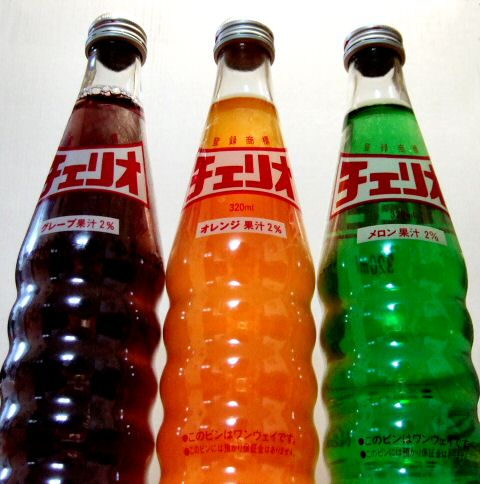
Grape, orange and melon Cheerio

Cheerio (チェリオ, Cherio) is a Japanese carbonated soft drink manufactured by the Cheerio Corporation. The drink comes in multiple flavors, and was introduced in 1963. The drinks used to be sold in glass bottles, similar to those used for Ramune. In recent years, with the proliferation of steel and aluminum cans and PET bottles, Cheerio (grape and orange only) in glass bottles is only available in the Chūbu region southwest of Tokyo, as well as three vending units in Kanagawa Prefecture.

== Flavors ==
- Apple
- Grape
- Melon
- Orange
- Fruit punch
- Organic black tea
- Organic green tea
