= Cheerio (company) =

Japanese soft drink manufacturing company

Cheerio Corporation (株式会社チェリオコーポレーション, Kabushiki Kaisha Cherio Kōporēshon) is a soft drink manufacturing company headquartered in Kyoto, Japan.

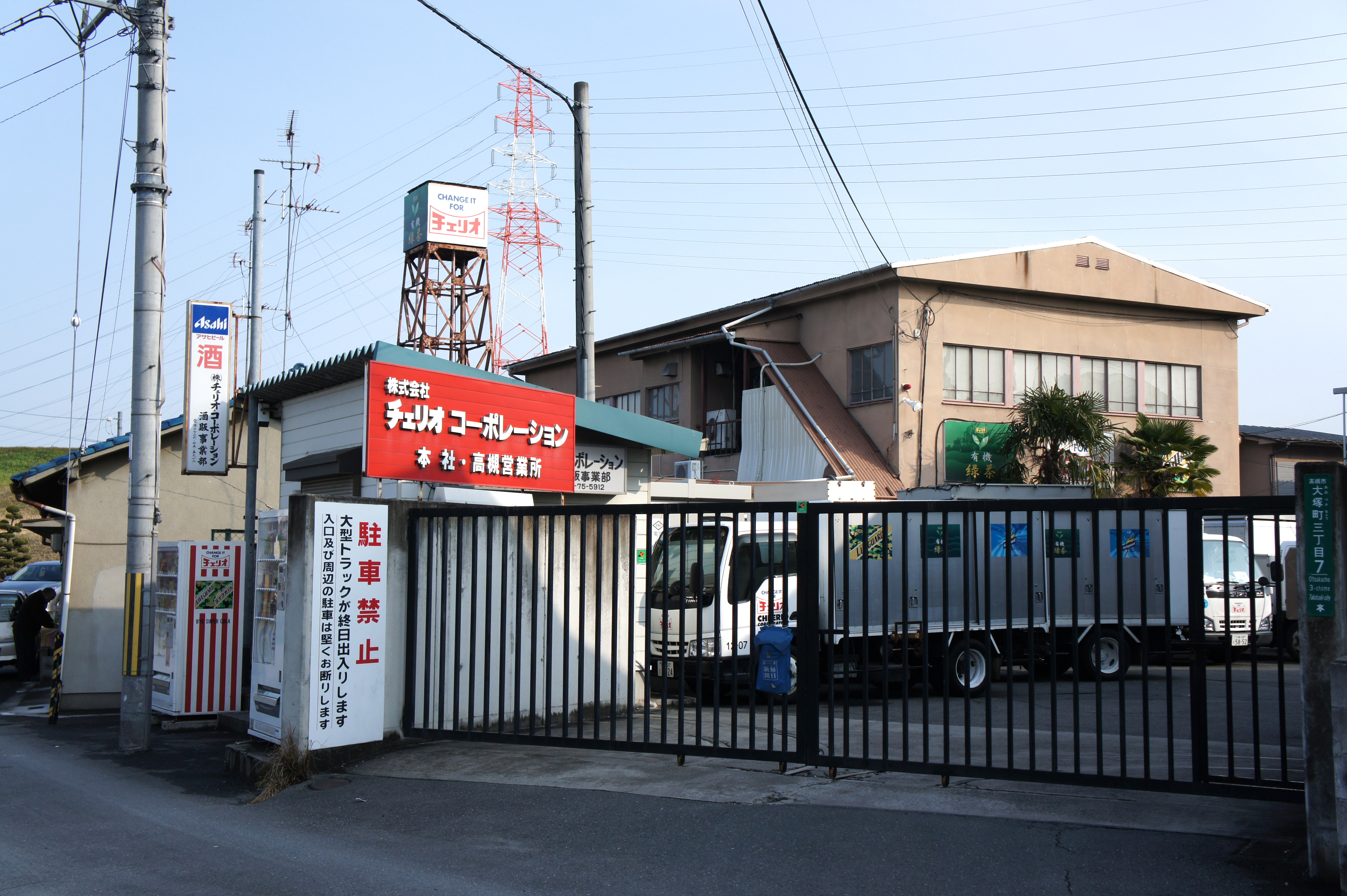

== Headquarters ==
The main office was in Takatsuki, a suburb of Osaka. Their address is 3-7-13 Otsuka-machi, Takatsuki-shi, Osaka-fu 〒569-0034

The president (selected by the board of directors) is Haruki Kan.

== History ==
In August 1961, the 7-Up company headquarters for Japan was established in Takatsuki, with production facilities opening there in April 1963. The company changed its name to Kansai Cheerio (株式会社チェリオ関西, Kabushiki Kaisha Cherio Kansai) in April 1987, then consolidated with Tokyo Cheerio (株式会社チェリオ東京, Kabushiki Kaisha Cherio Tōkyō) and changed to its current name in February 1991.

In May 2001, Cheerio obtained a license to manufacture alcoholic beverages. In June that same year, Cheerio obtained certification for the growing and manufacturing of products labelled "organic."

== Products ==
- Amino Safeguard
- Cheerio (grape, orange, apple, melon)
- For
- Lifeguard
- Lifeguard Jungleman X
- Milkyway Coenzyme
- Nihon no Cider
- Safeguard
- Sweet Kiss
- Green tea, Black tea, Wholesome tea

== Advertising slogan ==
The advertising slogan, 'Change it for Cheerio', can be found on vending machines, the sides of buildings, and in advertisements for Cheerio's products.
