= Champagne flow model =

A champagne flow is an astrophysical event whereby an HII region inside a molecular cloud expands outward until it reaches the interstellar medium. At that point, the ionized hydrogen gas bursts outward like an uncorked champagne bottle. This event is also sometimes called a Blister. An HII region is created by ionization from a recently formed star (usually an O-star) inside a molecular cloud.

The champagne model is perhaps one of the first numerical calculations of the propagation of ionisation fronts and of the expansion of HII regions that did not assume a constant density medium around the massive exciting star. The model assumes that star formation takes place in a dense cloud, surrounded and in pressure equilibrium with a low density inter-cloud gas. The ample supply of UV photons generated by the star rapidly establishes an HII region and the expansion of this, sooner or later allows also for the ionisation of the inter cloud gas. Ionisation disrupts then the former pressure balance between the cloud and the inter-cloud gas as under the stellar radiation field all photo-ionised gas acquires a temperature of the order of 10000 K. In this way, the ionised cloud material acquires an excess pressure, a pressure larger than the ionised low density inter cloud gas and this provoques the supersonic expansion of the ionised cloud matter into the surrounding gas (the champagne flow). The streaming of matter out of the cloud allows for the ionisation of a larger portion of the original cloud sustaining in this way the pressure imbalance which eventually leads to the complete disruption of the parent cloud. The terms champagne model and champagne flow were coined by Mexican astrophysicist Guillermo Tenorio-Tagle in a paper in 1979 (Astronomy and Astrophysics 1979A&A....71...59T). The model focus on the size, velocity field and the large density variations observed in HII regions. This article was followed by further hydrodynamical calculations in one and two dimensions, in collaboration with Drs. Peter Bodenheimer, Harold W. Yorke and Piet Bedijn see:1979ApJ...233…85B.1983A&A...127..313Y, 1979A&A....80..110T, 1982ASSL...93….1T, 1984A&A...138..325Y, 1981A&A....98…85B
