= IC 4406 =

Planetary nebula in the constellation of Lupus

Emission nebula
- Planetary nebula
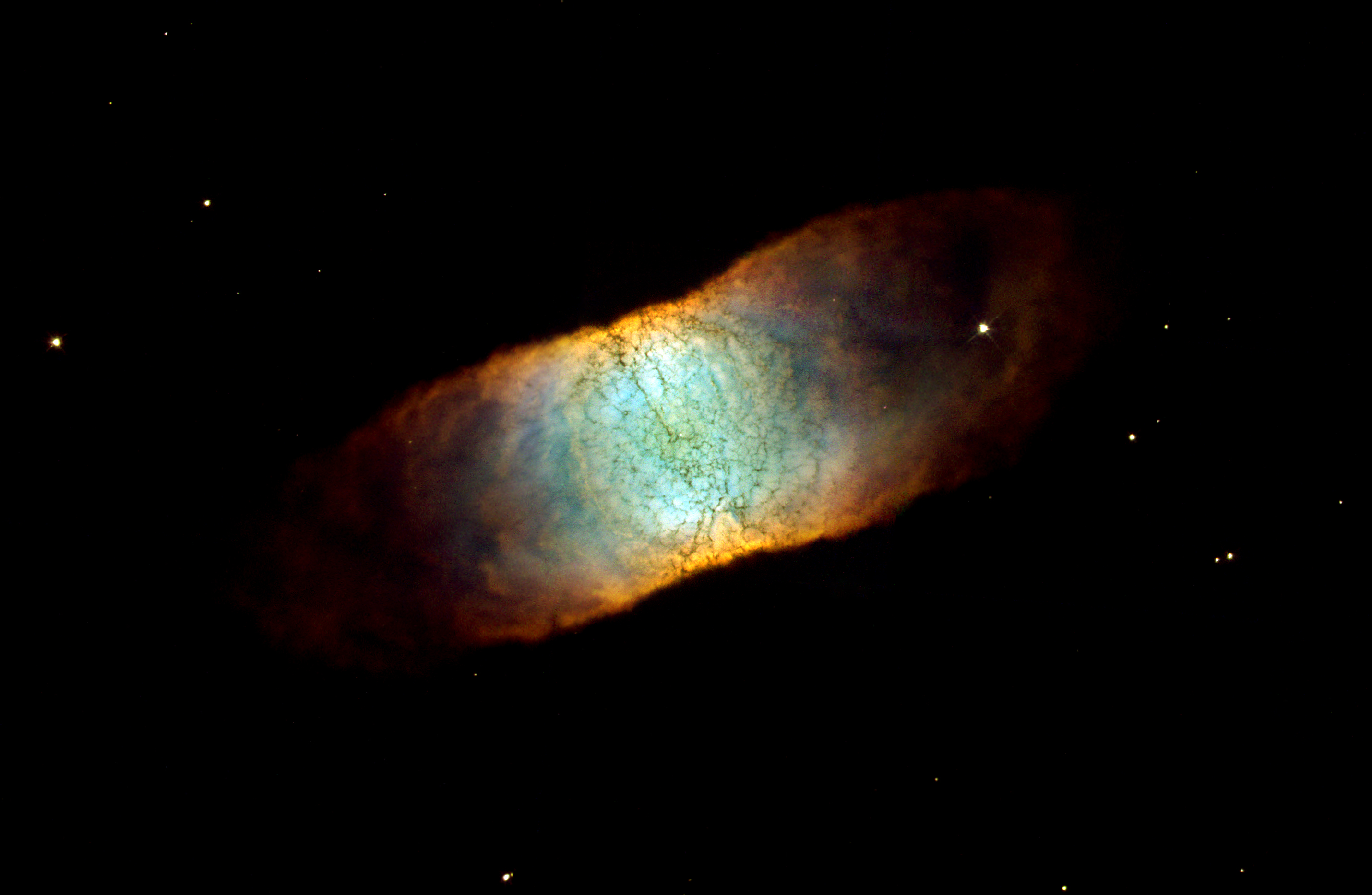
- Hubble Space Telescope view of IC 4406

Observation data: J2000 epoch
- Right ascension: 14^{h} 22^{m} 26.278^{s}
- Declination: −44° 09′ 04.35″
- Distance: 2.0 kly (600 pc) ly
- Constellation: Lupus

Physical characteristics
- Absolute magnitude (V): -0.3
- Notable features: -
- Designations: Retina Nebula

IC 4406, sometimes known as the Retina Nebula, is a planetary nebula near the western border of the constellation Lupus, the Wolf. It has dust clouds and has the shape of a torus. Despite this, it looks somewhat rectangular because it is seen from its side as viewed from Earth, almost in the plane of its equator.

== Structure ==
IC 4406 is bipolar and appears to be a prolate spheroid with strong concentrations of material in its equator. This kind of structure is a natural product of a bipolar model. The knots of IC 4406 have a "lacy" appearance and have no ordered symmetry towards the central star. The knots have no tails. None of the features have bright edges. At least 5 faint ring-like structures, seen as arcs north and south of the main nebula, have been detected in Very Large Telescope observations.

The central star of the planetary nebula has a spectral type similar to that of a Wolf–Rayet star. An analysis of Gaia data suggests that it may be a binary system.

== Gallery ==
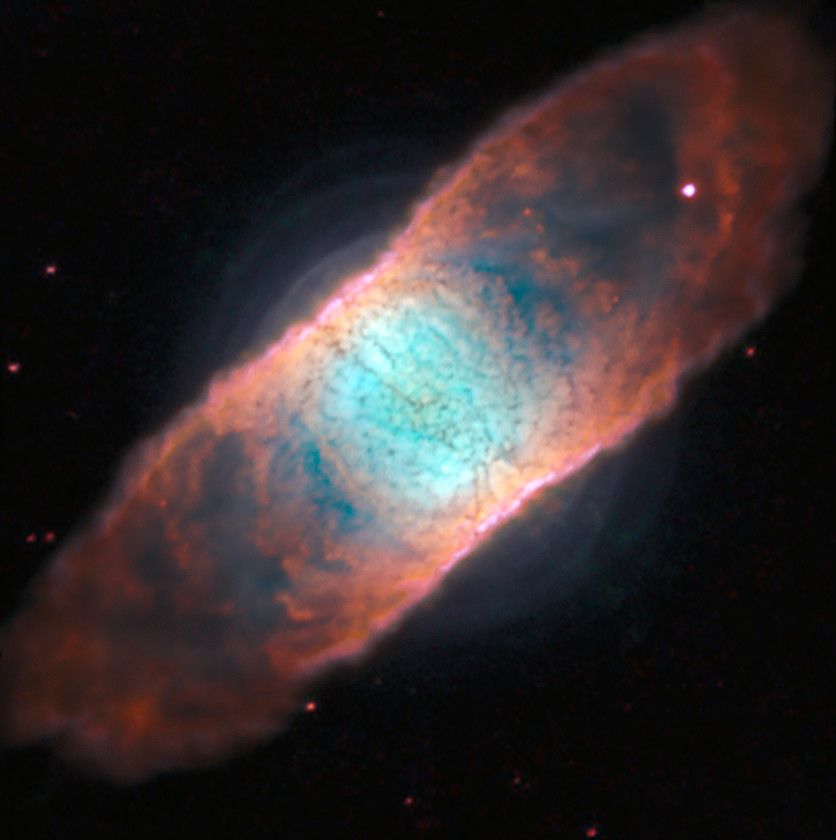
IC 4406 seen with MUSE instrument and the Adaptive Optics Facility.

== See also ==
- Planetary nebula
