= Dumbbell Nebula =

Planetary nebula in the constellation Vulpecula

Emission nebula
- Planetary nebula
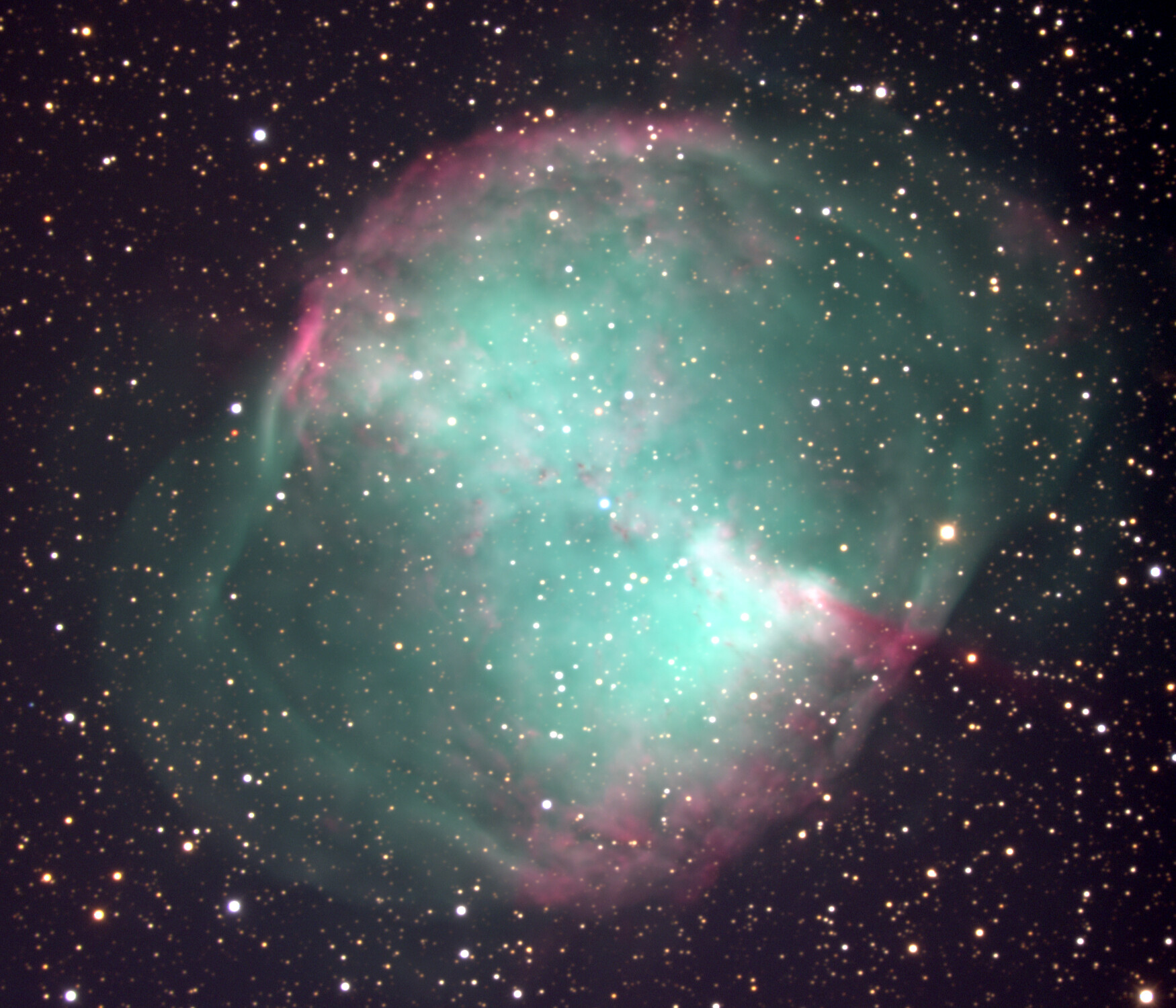
- Dumbbell Nebula (Messier 27) in Vulpecula

Observation data: J2000 epoch
- Right ascension: 19^{h} 59^{m} 36.319^{s}
- Declination: +22° 43′ 16.312″
- Distance: 389+15 −6 pc
- Apparent magnitude (V): 7.4
- Apparent dimensions (V): 8.0′ × 5.6′
- Constellation: Vulpecula

Physical characteristics
- Radius: 1.44+0.21 −0.16^{[a]} ly
- Absolute magnitude (V): −0.6+0.4 −0.3^{[d]}
- Notable features: Central star radius is among the largest known for a white dwarf.
- Designations: NGC 6853, M 27, Diabolo Nebula, Dumb-Bell Nebula,

The Dumbbell Nebula (also known as the Apple Core Nebula, Messier 27, and NGC 6853) is a planetary nebula (nebulosity surrounding a white dwarf) in the constellation Vulpecula, at a distance of about 1360 light-years. It was the first such nebula to be discovered, by Charles Messier in 1764. At its brightness of visual magnitude 7.5 and diameter of about 8 arcminutes, it is easily visible in binoculars and is a popular observing target in amateur telescopes.

The Dumbbell Nebula appears shaped like a prolate spheroid and is viewed from our perspective along the plane of its equator. In 1992, Moreno-Corral et al. computed that its rate of expansion angularly was, viewed from our distance, no more than 2.3 arcseconds (″) per century. From this, an upper limit to the age of 14,600 years may be determined. In 1970, Bohuski, Smith, and Weedman found an expansion velocity of 31 km/s. Given its semi-minor axis radius of 1.01 ly, this implies that the kinematic age of the nebula is 9,800 years.

Like many nearby planetary nebulae, the Dumbbell contains knots. Its central region is marked by a pattern of dark and bright cusped knots and their associated dark tails (see picture). The knots vary in appearance from symmetric objects with tails to rather irregular tail-less objects. Similarly to the Helix Nebula and the Eskimo Nebula, the heads of the knots have bright cusps which are local photoionization fronts.

The central star, a white dwarf progenitor, is estimated to have a radius which is 0.055±0.02 R_{☉} (0.13 light seconds) which gives it a size larger than most other known white dwarfs. Its mass was estimated in 1999 by Napiwotzki to be 0.56±0.01 M_{☉}.

== Appearance ==
Constellation Vulpecula
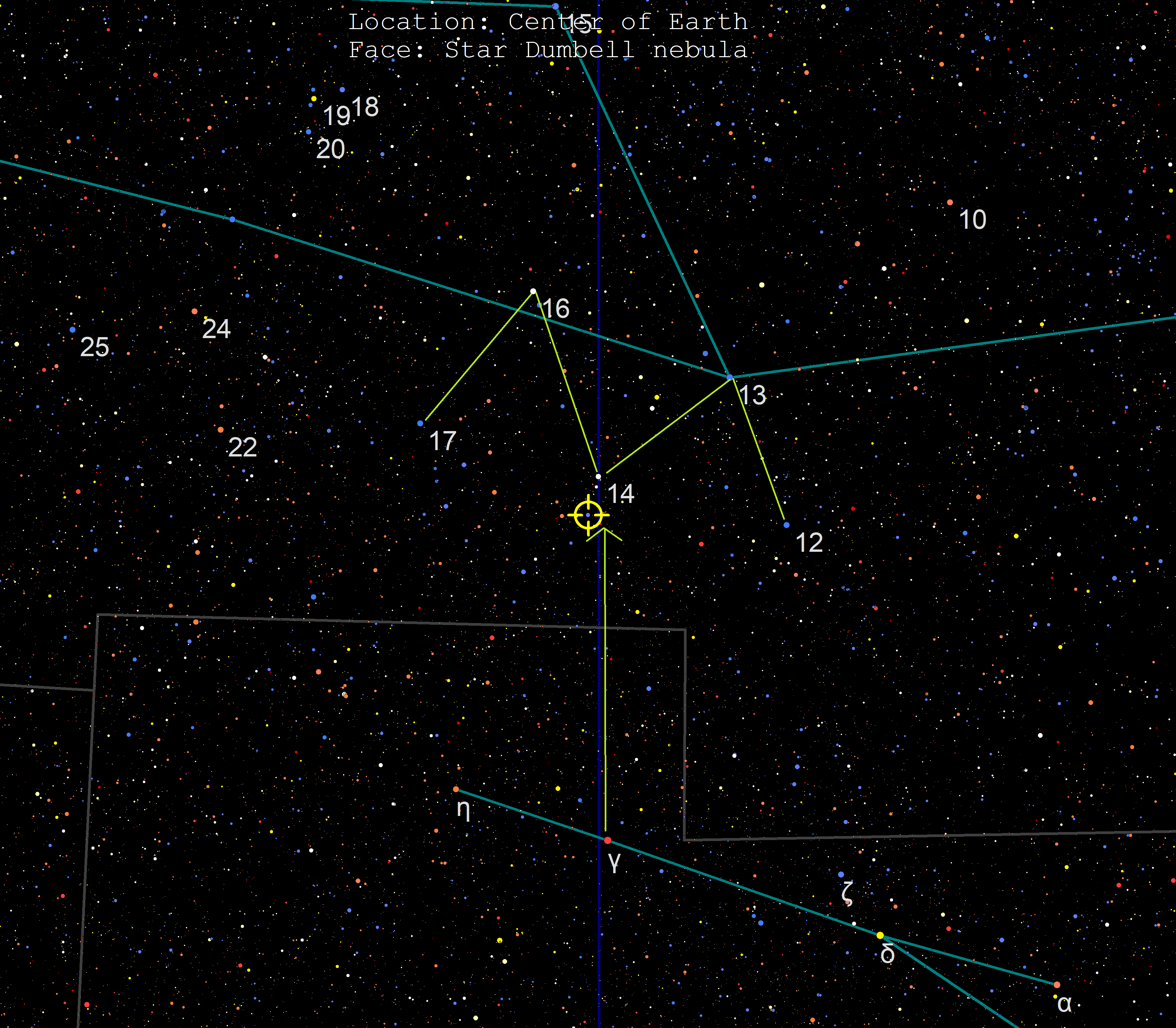
Location map

The Dumbbell Nebula is located in the faint constellation Vulpecula, within the Summer Triangle. It is located in the sky a few degrees north of γ Sagittae, near the star 14 Vulpeculae. It is bright enough to be seen in binoculars.

== Gallery ==
M27 in SHO. Taken with the Mayall 4-meter telescope's Mosaic camera at Kitt Peak National Observatory.

M27 in LRGB. 4 hours integration. Imaged by amateur from Death Valley Observatories

M27 in HOO. 3 hours integration. Imaged by amateur.

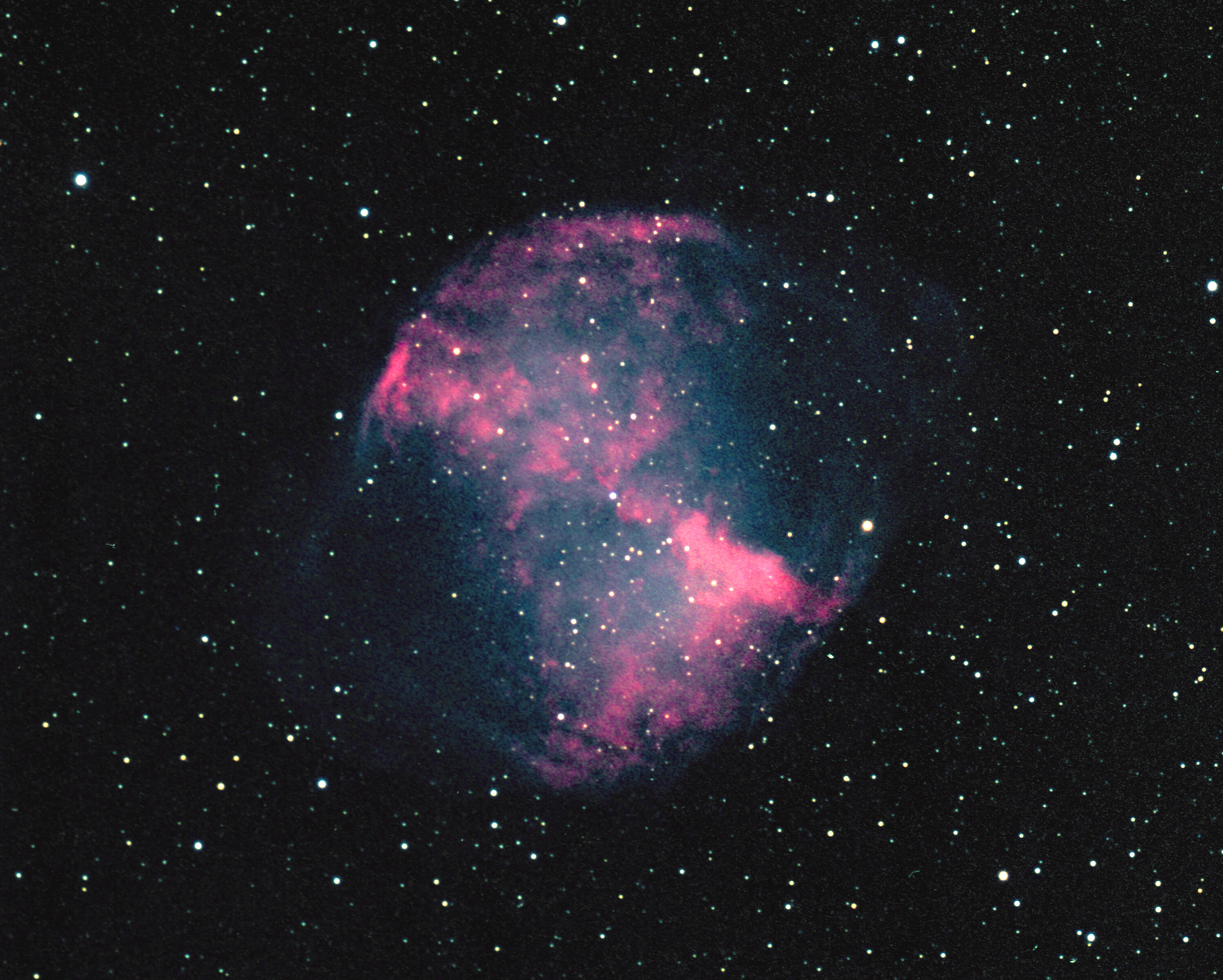
M27 in true color. Taken using Ektachrome film at the Kitt Peak 4m telescope on July 2nd 1973.

== See also ==
- Messier object
- List of Messier objects
- List of planetary nebulae
- New General Catalogue

== Notes ==
1. Radius = distance × sin(angular size / 2) = 1240+180
  −140 * sin(8′.0 / 2) = 1.44+0.21
  −0.16 ly
2. Semi minor axis = distance × sin(minor axis size / 2) = 1240+180
  −140 × sin(5′.6 / 2) = 1.01+0.15
  −0.11 ly
3. Kinematic age = semi-minor axis / expansion rate = 1.01+0.15
  −0.11^{[b]} ly / 31 km/s = 9.56+1.42
  −1.04×10^{12} km / 31 km/s = 3.08+0.46
  −0.34×10^{11} s = 9800+1500
  −1100 yr
4. 7.5 apparent magnitude - 5 × (log_{10}(420+50
  −70 pc distance) - 1) = −0.6+0.4
  −0.3 absolute magnitude
