= Sh 2-4 =

Emission nebula

Sharpless 2-4
Emission nebula
- H II region
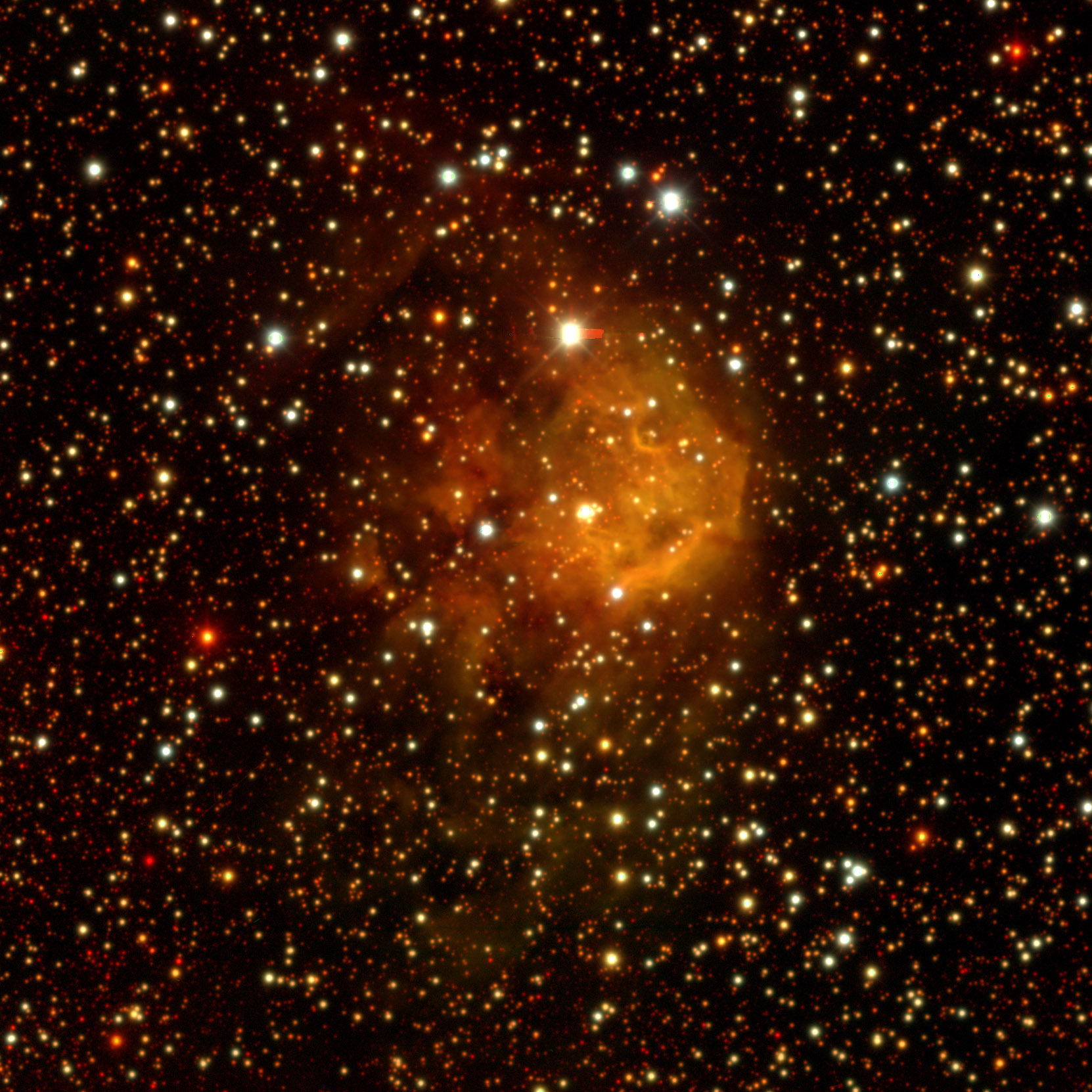
- As seen by the DESI Legacy Survey

Observation data: epoch
- Right ascension: 17^{h} 19^{m} 48.5^{s}
- Declination: −39° 20′ 19″
- Distance: 8,800 ly (2,700 pc)
- Apparent magnitude (V): 14.95
- Apparent dimensions (V): 5'
- Constellation: Scorpius
- Designations: RCW 121, ESO 333-3, IRAS 17149-3916, Haro 3-6, PN H 2-6

Sh 2-4 is an emission nebula in the constellation Scorpius. It is part of the Sharpless Catalog assembled by Stewart Sharpless. It was originally misidentified as a planetary nebula. The incorrect planetary designation PN H 2-6 can still be used as an identifier. It may be associated with the star cluster Havlen-Moffat 1.

== Visibility ==
The nebula is bright, and visible with longer exposure. The nebula mostly emits red light, making viewing through a hydrogen-alpha filter effective.

== Structure ==
Havlen-Moffat 1 is known to be a source of ionization within Sh 2-4. The nebula contains two Wolf-Rayet stars, designated WR 87 and WR 89. Contained within the nebula is the infrared cluster [DBS2003] 118.
