= NGC 6337 =

Planetary nebula in the constellation Scorpius

Emission nebula
- Planetary nebula
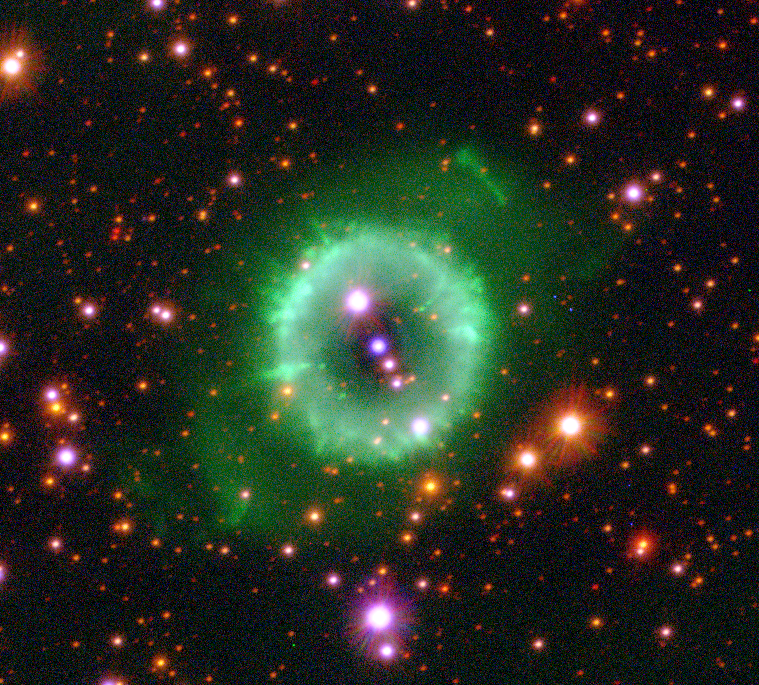
- Image of NGC 6337 with the VLT Survey Telescope. Green part of the image was taken with the H-alpha filter.

Observation data: J2000 epoch
- Right ascension: 17^{h} 22^{m} 15.67^{s}
- Declination: −38° 29′ 01.73″
- Apparent dimensions (V): 0.783' (arcmin)
- Constellation: Scorpius
- Designations: Ghostly Cheerio, Cheerio Nebula

NGC 6337, the Ghostly Cheerio or Cheerio Nebula, is a toroidal planetary nebula in the constellation Scorpius. It appears as a ring-shaped (annular) transparent nebula resembling a piece of the breakfast cereal Cheerios, hence the name. Filament and knots, and a faint shell surround the ring. Its magnitude is 11.90; its position in Scorpius is right ascension 17^{h} 22^{m}15.67^{s}, declination -38° 29' 01.73". The Ghostly Cheerio has a redshift value of -0.000236.

There is convincing evidence that a binary nucleus exists at the center of the nebula, with masses of 0.6 and 0.3 M⊙, and a separation of ≤ 1.26 R⊙, indicating a probable common envelope phase. The Ghostly Cheerio's projected radial expansion is slow, averaging 1–2 kilometres per second (0.6–1.2 mi/s).

NGC 6337 is contained within, but is not a part of, the larger nebula Sh 2-5.

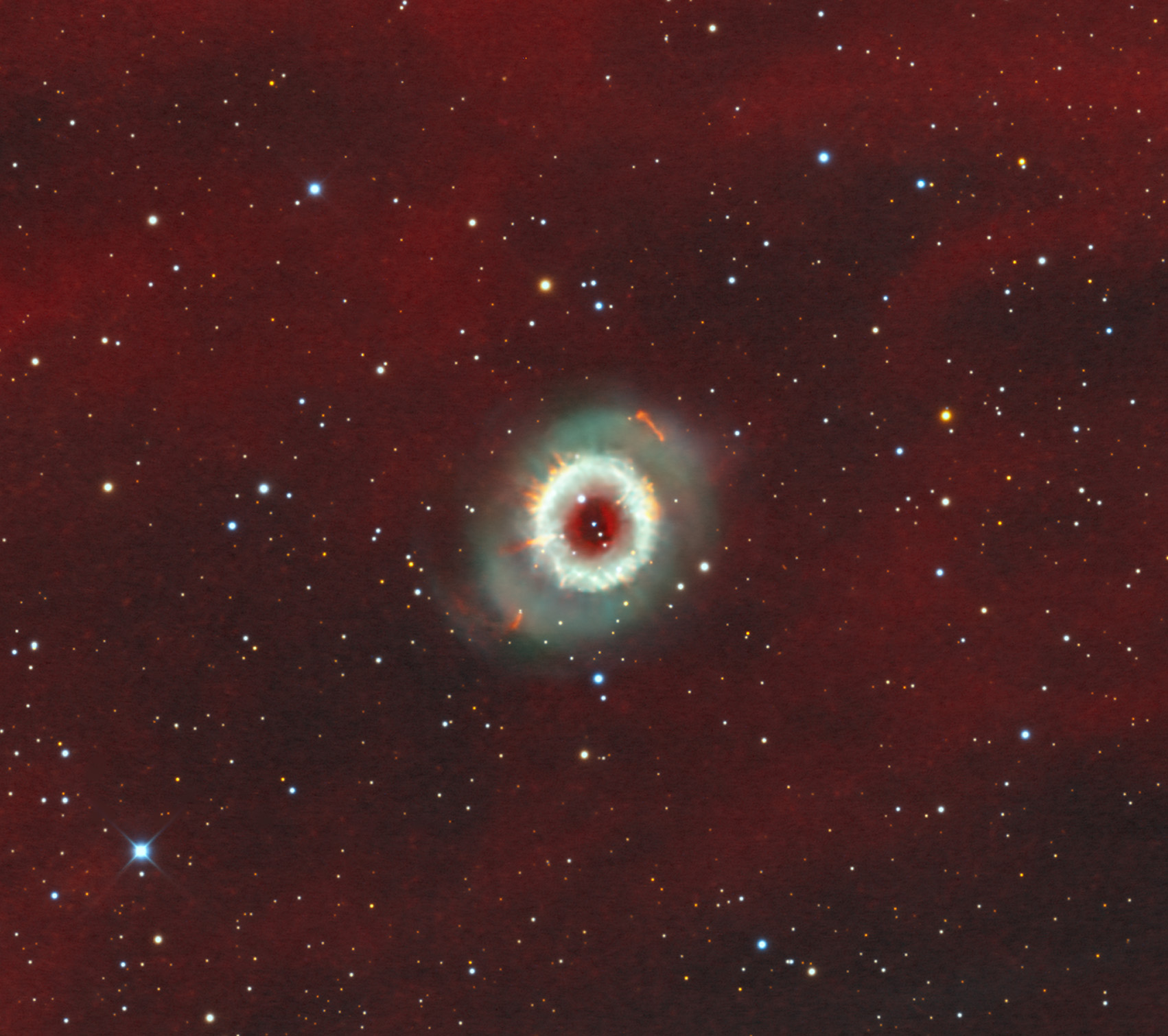
A deep narrowband image of NGC 6337 in Ha (red), SII (orange), and OIII (green).

== See also ==
- List of NGC objects (6001–7000)
