= Gum catalog =

Astronomical catalog of nebulae

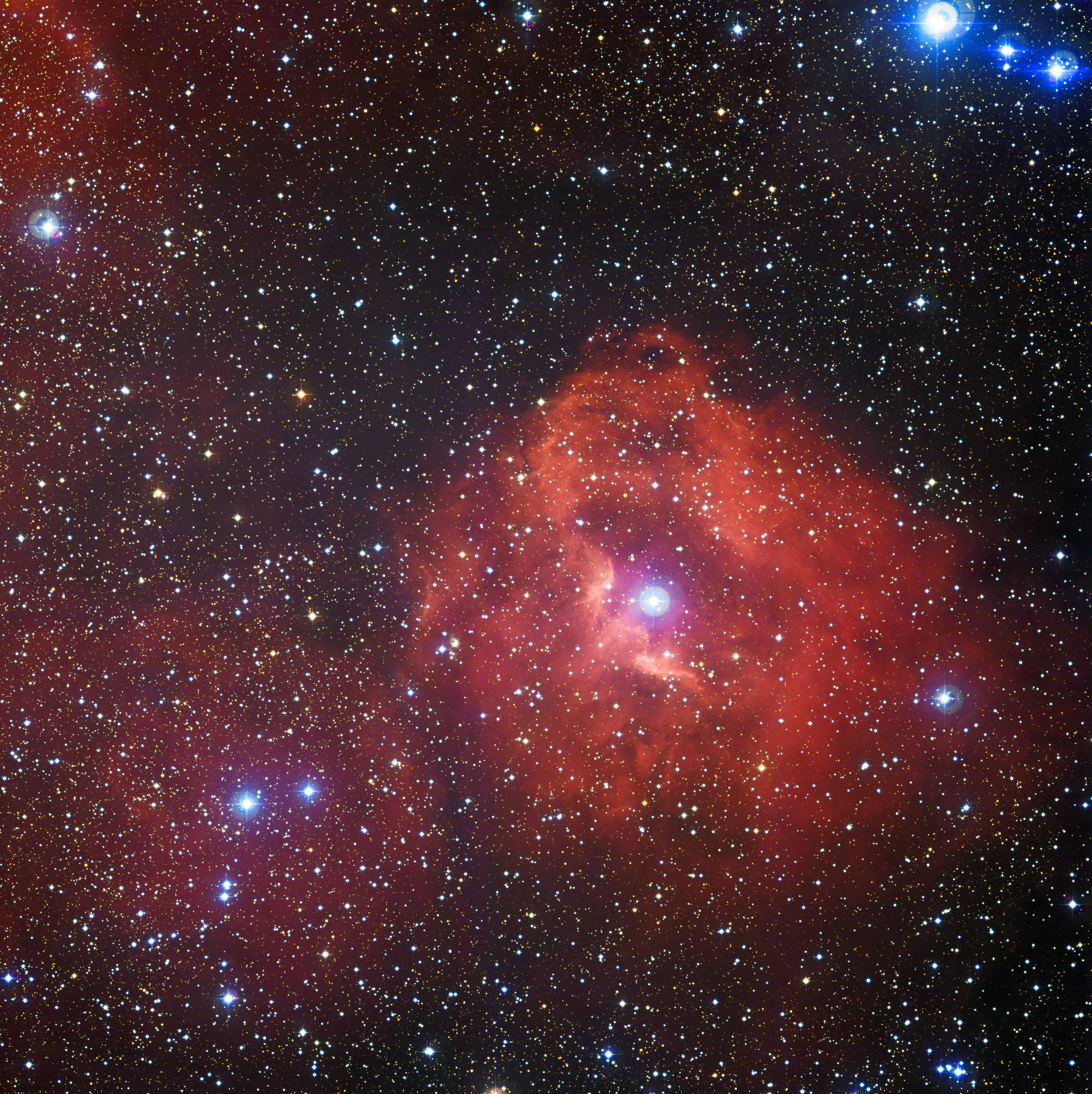
- The star formation region Gum 41
- Related media on Commons

The Gum catalog is an astronomical catalog of 84 emission nebulae in the southern sky. It was made by the Australian astronomer Colin Stanley Gum (1924–1960) at Mount Stromlo Observatory using wide field photography. Gum published his findings in 1955 in a study entitled A study of diffuse southern H-alpha nebulae which presented a catalog of 84 nebulae or nebular complexes. Similar catalogs include the Sharpless catalog and the RCW catalog, and many of the Gum objects are repeated in these other catalogs. However, the RCW and Gum catalogs were mainly of the southern hemisphere (Mount Stromlo is in the southern hemisphere)

The Gum Nebula is named for Gum, who discovered it as Gum 12; it is an emission nebula that can be found in the southern constellations Vela and Puppis.

== Examples ==
Gum	A common name	Images	Names & Designations
Gum 1	IC 2177		Gum 1, IC 2177, Sh2-292, Emission nebula
Gum 4	NGC 2359		Thor's Helmet, Gum 4, Sharpless 298, NGC 2359
Gum 6	RCW 7		Gum 6, RCW 7, Sh 2-302
Gum 12	Gum Nebula		Gum 12, The Gum Nebula in Vela and Puppis
Gum 15	RCW 32		Gum 15, Star Formation Region
Gum 16	Vela Supernova Remnant		Gum 16, Vela Supernova Remnant
Gum 20	RCW 36		RCW 36
Gum 29	RCW 49		Gum 29, RCW 49
Gum 30	NGC 3293		Gum 30, NGC 3293
Gum 31	NGC 3324		Gum 31, Gabriela Mistral Nebula, ESO 128-EN006, Cr 225, Lund 552, h 3286, GC 2167,OCl 819.0, MWSC 1830, NGC 3324
Gum 60	NGC 6302		Sh2-6, NGC 6302, Bug Nebula, PK 349+01 1, Butterfly Nebula, RCW 124, Caldwell 69
Gum 64	NGC 6334		ESO 392-EN 009, Sharpless 8, RCW 127, Gum 64, NGC 6334
Gum 66	NGC 6357		Sh2-11, NGC 6357, RCW 131, Gum 66, War and Peace Nebula
Gum 72	Lagoon Nebula		Sh2 25, RCW 146, Gum 72, Messier 8
Gum 73	Sh 2-27		Sh2 27, LBN 24, Gum 73
Gum 76	Trifid Nebula		Sh2 30, Messier 20, NGC 6514, RCW 147, Gum 76
Gum 78	Twiddlebug Nebula		IC 1283/4, Sh2 37, RCW 153, Gum 78
Gum 81	Omega Nebula		Omega Nebula, Messier 17, NGC 6618, Swan Nebula, Sharpless 45, RCW 160, Gum 81
Gum 83	Eagle Nebula		Sh2 49, Messier 16, NGC 6611, RCW 165, Gum 83

== List ==
- Gum 1
- Gum 2
- Gum 3
- Gum 4
- Gum 5
- Gum 6
- Gum 7
- Gum 8
- Gum 9
- Gum 10
- Gum 12
- Gum 13
- Gum 14
- Gum 15
- Gum 16
- Gum 17
- Gum 18
- Gum 19
- Gum 20
- Gum 21
- Gum 22
- Gum 23
- Gum 24
- Gum 25
- Gum 26
- Gum 27
- Gum 28
- Gum 29
- Gum 30
- Gum 31
- Gum 32
- Gum 33
- Gum 34
- Gum 35
- Gum 36
- Gum 37
- Gum 38
- Gum 39
- Gum 40
- Gum 41
- Gum 42
- Gum 43
- Gum 44
- Gum 45
- Gum 46
- Gum 47
- Gum 48
- Gum 49
- Gum 50
- Gum 51
- Gum 52
- Gum 53
- Gum 54
- Gum 55
- Gum 56
- Gum 57
- Gum 58
- Gum 59
- Gum 60
- Gum 61
- Gum 62
- Gum 63
- Gum 64
- Gum 65
- Gum 66
- Gum 67
- Gum 68
- Gum 69
- Gum 70
- Gum 71
- Gum 72
- Gum 73
- Gum 74
- Gum 75
- Gum 76
- Gum 77
- Gum 78
- Gum 79
- Gum 80
- Gum 81
- Gum 82
- Gum 83
- Gum 84
- Gum 85

== Star chart ==
Chart of RCW and Gum HII regions

== See also ==
- RCW Catalogue
