= W28 =

W28 may refer to:

- Excavated dodecahedron
- Jiwarli dialect
- Sequim Valley Airport, in Clallam County, Washington, United States
- W28 (nuclear warhead)
- RCW 145, containing supernova remnant W 28
