= Barbara A. Williams =

American radio astrophysicist

- Born: Barbara Ann Williams
- Education: University of North Carolina at Greensboro; University of Maryland, College Park
- Known for: Radio astronomy
- Scientific career
- Workplaces: University of Delaware; University of North Carolina at Chapel Hill; University of North Carolina at Greensboro
- Doctoral advisor: Frank John Kerr

Barbara Ann Williams is an American radio astronomer who was the first African-American woman to earn a PhD in astronomy (University of Maryland, College Park, 1981). Her research largely focused on compact galaxy groups, in particular observations of their emissions in the H I region in order to build up a larger scale picture of the structure and evolution of galaxies. Williams was named as the Outstanding Young Woman of America in 1986. She is a retired associate professor in the Department of Physics and Astronomy at the University of Delaware.

== Early life and education ==
Williams earned her bachelor's degree in physics at the University of North Carolina at Greensboro. She moved to the University of Maryland, College Park for her graduate studies, earning a Master's and PhD in the field of radio astronomy in 1981. She was a member of Phi Beta Kappa academic honor society. Williams was the first African-American woman to earn a PhD in astronomy. She studied elliptical galaxies using HI emissions. She returned to the University of North Carolina at Greensboro as a research associate, where she worked until 1984. In 1984 Williams was appointed as a postdoctoral fellow at the University of North Carolina at Chapel Hill. She spent a year as a NASA-American Society for Engineering Education summer faculty member at the Goddard Space Flight Center. She was named as the 1986 Outstanding Young Woman of America.

== Career ==
Williams's research focused on radio astronomy and the study of galaxies. She used radio waves to examine groups of galaxies with compact cores and HI emissions to study several galaxies, including the IC 698 group. Williams's work on the Hickson Compact Group of galaxies established that atomic gases must undergo a phase transformation to result in the observed HI deficiency. She used VLA neutral hydrogen imaging of compact galaxy groups.

Williams was made an associate professor at the University of Delaware in 1986. There, Williams later studied educational research and in particular strategies to retain women in physics. Williams is a Fellow of the National Society of Black Physicists.

Along with Sheella Mierson, Williams was the co-principal investigator of a study on problem-based learning in introductory sciences, in the Center for Teaching Effectiveness, University of Delaware.
