= SMM J2135−0102 =

Galaxy in the constellation Aquarius

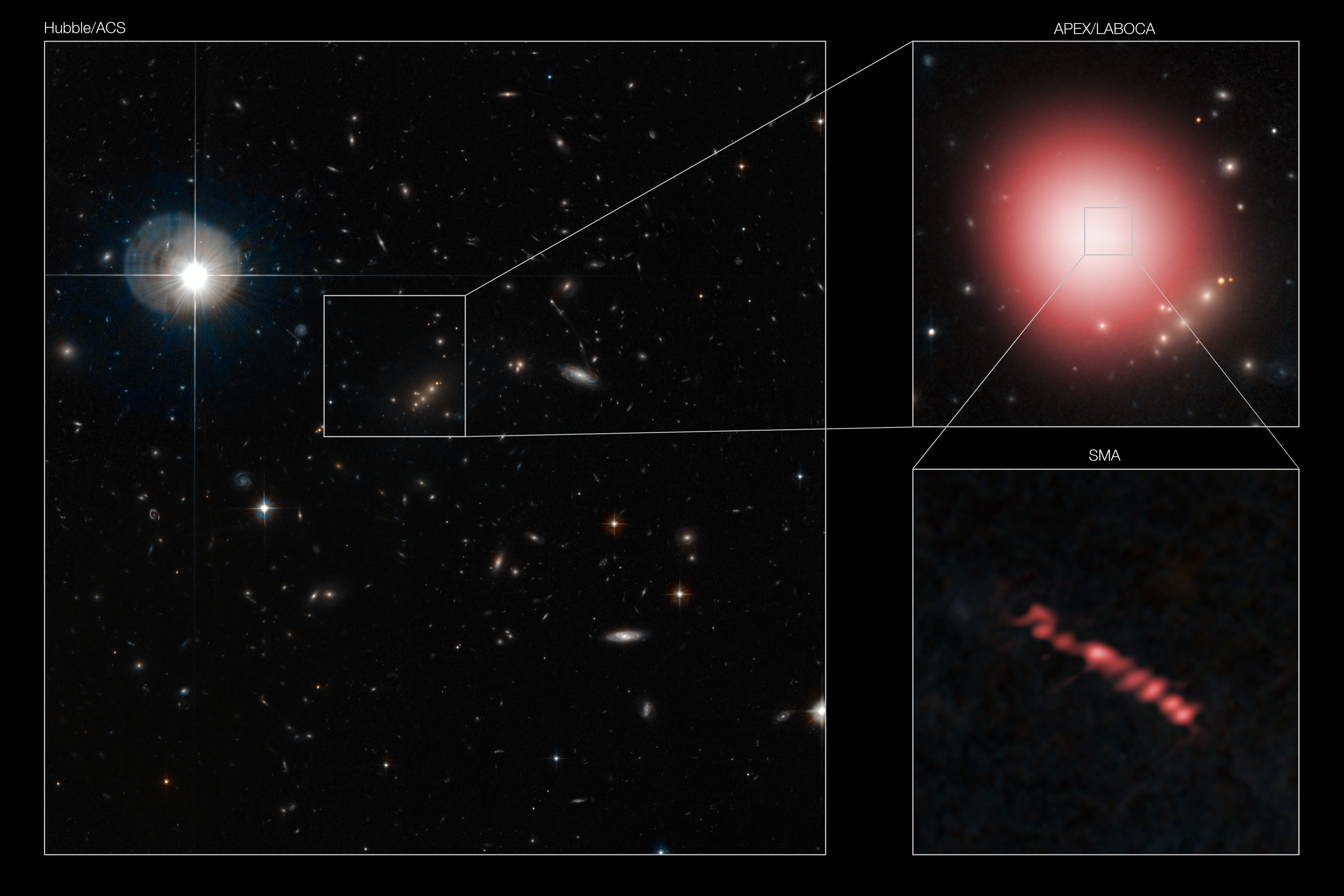
- Left: View of the foreground galaxy cluster MACS J2135−010217; Right: SMM J2135−0102 (top) with star-forming clouds (bottom)

Observation data (J2000 epoch)
- Constellation: Aquarius
- Right ascension: 21^{h} 35^{m} 11.60^{s}
- Declination: −01° 02′ 52.0″
- Redshift: 2.3259
- Distance: 10 billion

Other designations
- Eyelash

SMM-J2135−0102 (also known as the Cosmic Eyelash) is a galaxy located at a distance of z=2.3258. There have been four molecular clouds whose solar luminosity is 100 times higher than similar regions of the Milky Way galaxy. This suggests that star formation in this galaxy is 250 times higher.

The object was discovered using the Large Apex Bolometer Camera (LABOCA) of the Atacama Pathfinder Experiment (APEX) telescope by a group of researchers during an observation session of the galaxy supercluster, MACS J2135−010217. The cluster causes a gravitational lens effect that amplified SMM-J2135−0102 by 32 times. This is what made it possible to identify four molecular clouds with high luminosity.

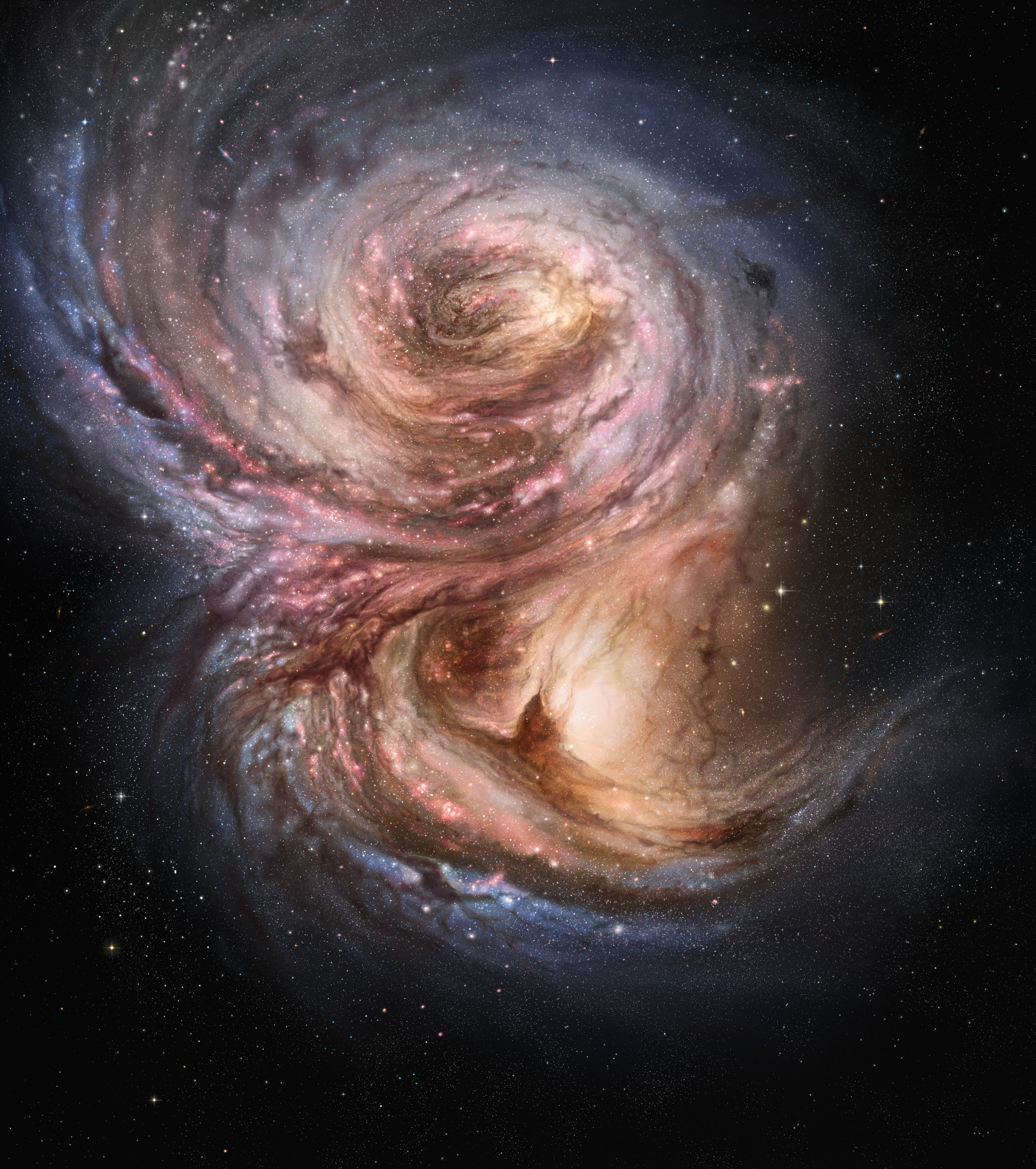
Artist’s impression of the distant galaxy SMM J2135−0102 shows large bright clouds a few hundred light-years in size, which are regions of active star formation
