= Gum 41 =

Nebula located in the Centaurus constellation

Nebula
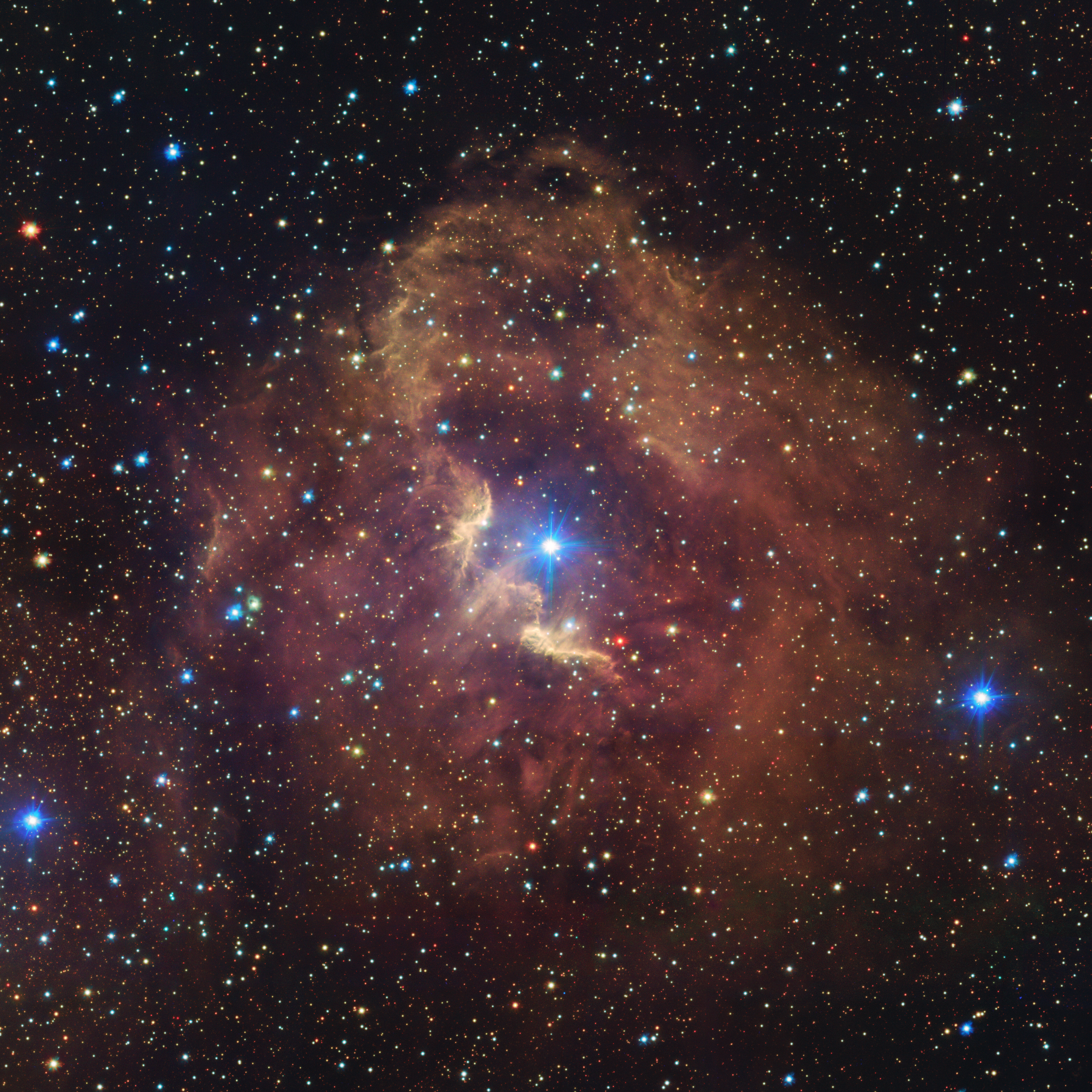
- Image of Gum 41 from ESO by the VLT Survey Telescope

Observation data
- Distance: 7,300 ly
- Constellation: Centaurus

Gum 41 is a nebula located around 7,300 light years from Earth in the constellation of Centaurus. It is part of a larger region known as the Running Chicken nebula.

== Properties ==
In the center of the nebula is a potential system of two young massive stars named HD 100099 (O9III). These stars ionize the hydrogen surrounding it making Gum 41 an example of a Strömgren sphere, a shell of ionized hydrogen around a central star.

== Discovery ==
Gum 41 was discovered in 1955 by Colin Gum, an Australian astronomer. It was discovered through images taken at the Mount Stromlo Observatory near Canberra.
