= Sh 2-13 =

Emission nebula

Sharpless 2-13
Nebula
- H II region
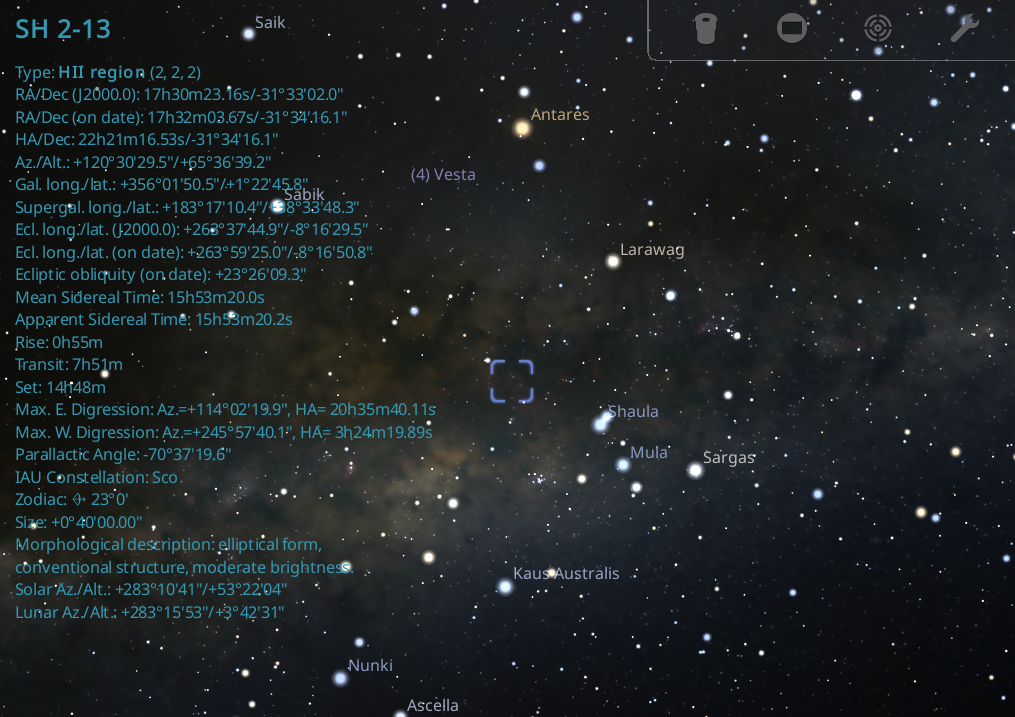
- The location of Sh 2-13 in the sky, (in the open source Stellarium software)

Observation data: epoch
- Right ascension: 17^{h} 30^{m} 24^{s}
- Declination: −31° 33′ 09″
- Distance: 1300±100 pc
- Apparent diameter: 40'
- Designations: RCW 133, Gum 68

Sh 2-13 is an emission nebula in Scorpius. It is ionized by nearby star HD 158186. Sh 2-13 also contains a star cluster it has formed, Antalova 1. It is possible HD 158186 is a member of Antalova 1, it is also possible it is a runaway star from NGC 6383.
