= NGC 5189 =

Planetary nebula in the constellation Musca

Emission nebula
- Planetary nebula
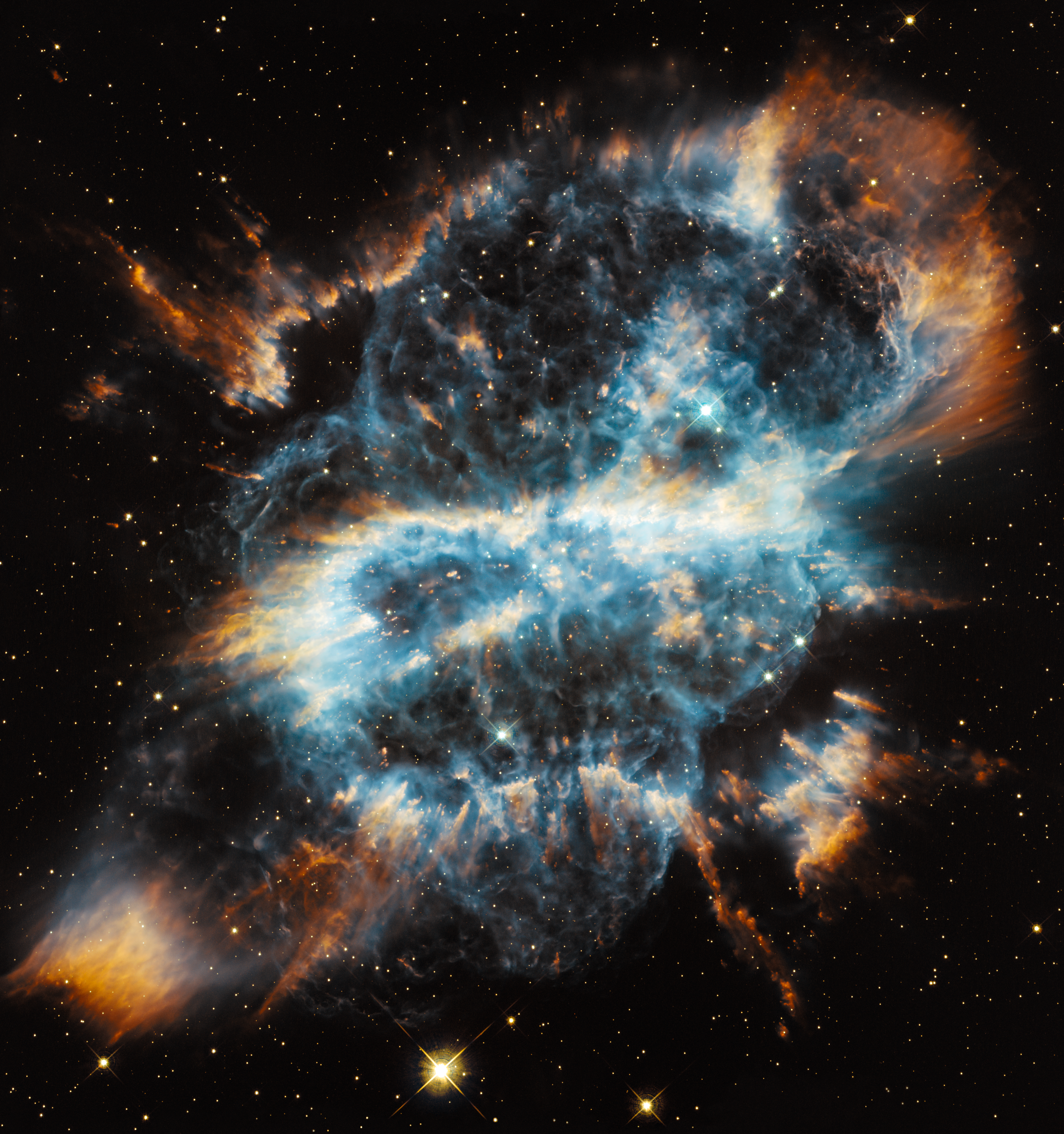
- NGC 5189 image taken with the Hubble Space Telescope on July 6, 2012

Observation data: J2000.0 epoch
- Right ascension: 13^{h} 33^{m} 32.97^{s}
- Declination: −65° 58′ 26.7″
- Distance: 3000 ly
- Apparent magnitude (V): 8.2, 8.5p
- Apparent dimensions (V): 90 × 62 arcsec
- Constellation: Musca

Physical characteristics
- Radius: ~1 ly
- Absolute magnitude (V): -
- Notable features: A peculiar PN with a binary in the center
- Designations: Spiral Planetary Nebula, Gum 47, IC 4274, He2-94, Sa2-95, PK 307-3.1

NGC 5189 (Gum 47, IC 4274, nicknamed Spiral Planetary Nebula) is a planetary nebula in the constellation Musca. It was discovered by James Dunlop on 1 July 1826, who catalogued it as Δ252. For many years, well into the 1960s, it was thought to be a bright emission nebula. It was Karl Gordon Henize in 1967 who first described NGC 5189 as quasi-planetary based on its spectral emissions.

Seen through the telescope it seems to have an S shape, reminiscent of a barred spiral galaxy. The S shape, together with point-symmetric knots in the nebula, have for a long time hinted to astronomers that a binary central star is present. The Hubble Space Telescope imaging analysis showed that this S shape structure is indeed two dense low-ionization regions: one moving toward the north-east and another one moving toward the south-west of the nebula, which could be a result of a recent outburst from the central star. Observations with the Southern African Large Telescope have finally found a white dwarf companion in a 4.04 day orbit around the rare low-mass Wolf-Rayet type central star of NGC 5189. NGC 5189 is estimated to be 546 parsecs or 1,780 light years away from Earth. Other measurements have yielded results up to 900 parsecs (~3000 light-years).

There is a very similar planetary nebula in the Large Magellanic Cloud, N66, which also contains a Wolf-Rayet nucleus.
