= Atacama Pathfinder Experiment =

Radio telescope in the Atacama Desert, northern Chile

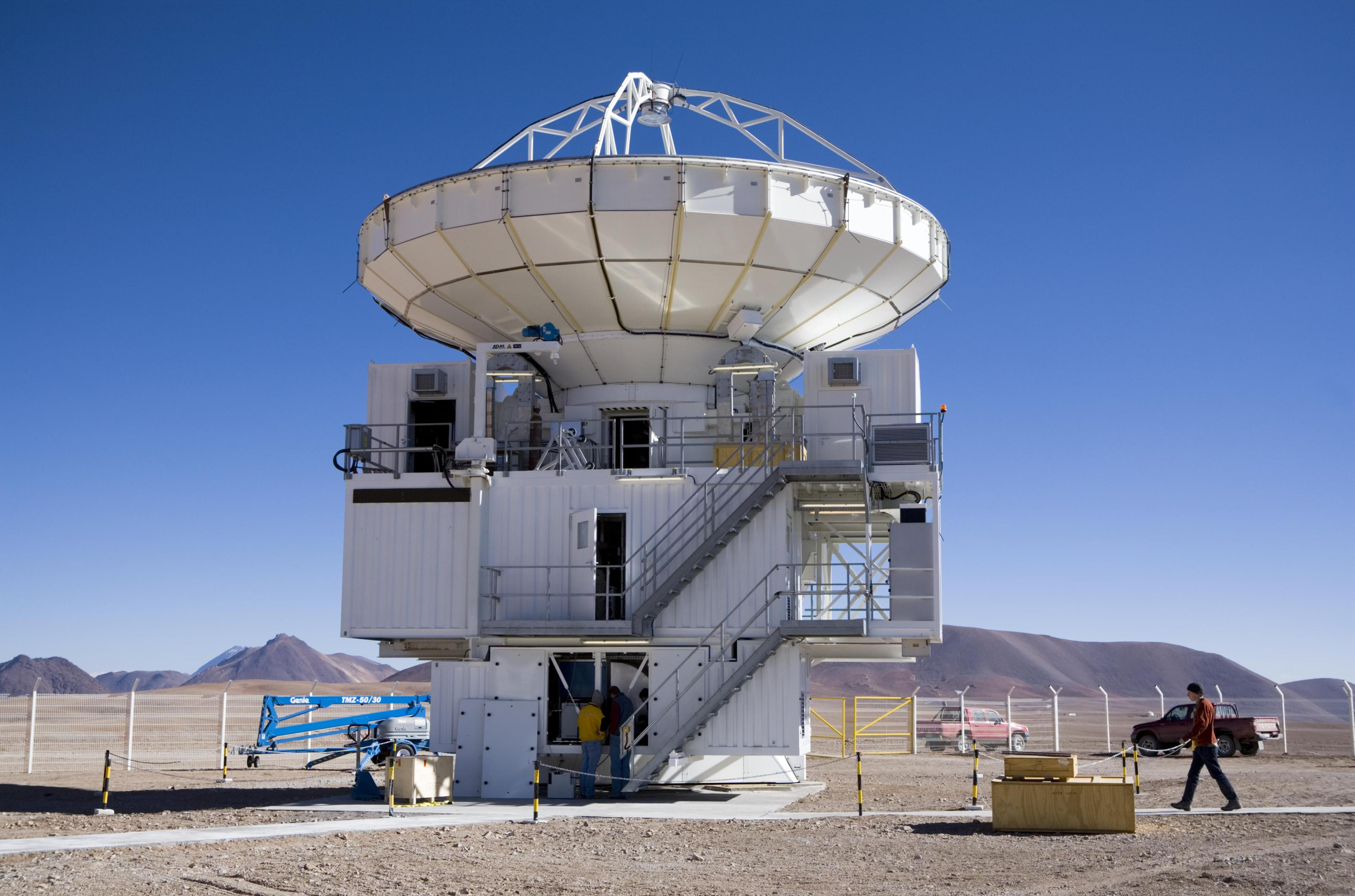
- The APEX telescope
- Alternative names: APEX
- Location(s): Antofagasta, Antofagasta Province, Antofagasta Region, Chile
- Coordinates: 23°00′21″S 67°45′33″W
- Altitude: 5,104 m (16,745 ft)
- Wavelength: 0.2, 1.5 mm (1.50, 0.20 THz)
- Diameter: 12 m (39 ft 4 in)
- Website: www.apex-telescope.org
- Location of Atacama Pathfinder Experiment
- Related media on Commons

The Atacama Pathfinder Experiment (APEX) is a radio telescope 5,104 meters above sea level, at the Llano de Chajnantor Observatory in the Atacama Desert in northern Chile, 50 km east of San Pedro de Atacama built and operated by three European research institutes. The main dish has a diameter of 12 m and consists of 264 aluminium panels with an average surface accuracy of 17 micrometres (rms). The telescope was officially inaugurated on September 25, 2005.

The APEX telescope is a modified ALMA (Atacama Large Millimeter Array) prototype antenna and is at the site of the ALMA observatory. APEX is designed to work at sub-millimetre wavelengths, in the 0.2 to 1.5 mm range — between infrared light and radio waves — and to find targets that ALMA will be able to study in greater detail. Submillimetre astronomy provides a window into the cold, dusty and distant Universe, but the faint signals from space are heavily absorbed by water vapour in the Earth's atmosphere. Chajnantor was chosen as the location for such a telescope because the region is one of the driest on the planet and is more than 750 m higher than the observatories on Mauna Kea and 2400 m higher than the Very Large Telescope (VLT) on Cerro Paranal.

APEX was a collaboration between the Max Planck Institute for Radio Astronomy (MPIfR) (55%), the Onsala Space Observatory (OSO, 13%), and the European Organisation for Astronomical Research in the Southern Hemisphere ESO (32%). It is now a sole project of the MPIfR, hosted and operated by ESO on behalf of the MPIfR.

== Science ==
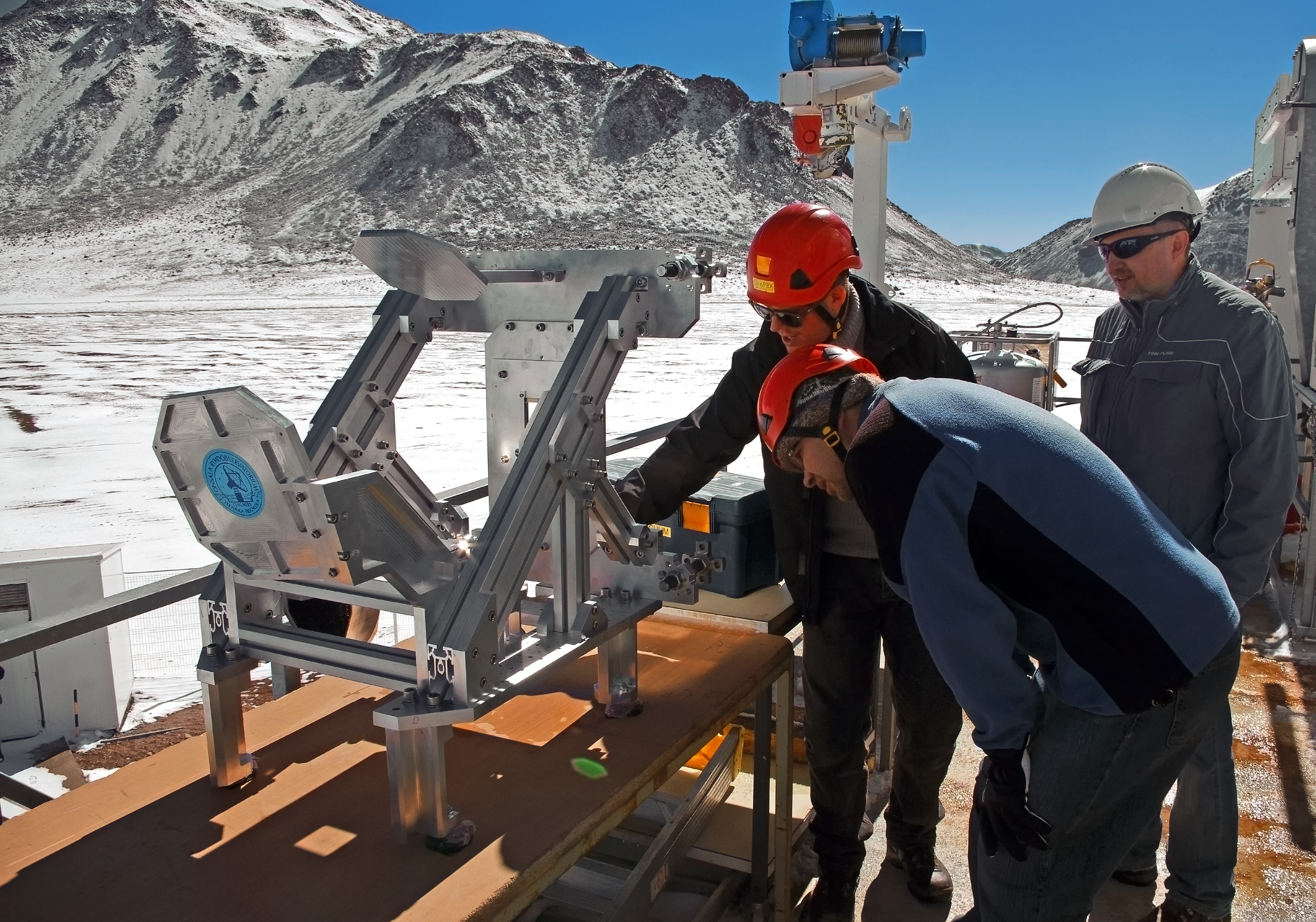
APEX instrument for finding water in the Universe

Submillimetre astronomy is a relatively unexplored frontier in astronomy and reveals a Universe that cannot be seen in the more familiar visible or infrared light. It is ideal for studying the "cold Universe": light at these wavelengths shines from vast cold clouds in interstellar space, at temperatures only a few tens of degrees above absolute zero. Astronomers use this light to study the chemical and physical conditions in these molecular clouds — the dense regions of gas and cosmic dust where new stars are being born. Seen in visible light, these regions of the Universe are often dark and obscured due to the dust, but they shine brightly in the millimetre and submillimetre part of the spectrum. This wavelength range is also ideal for studying some of the earliest and most distant galaxies in the Universe, whose light has been redshifted into these longer wavelengths.

APEX science goals include studying the formation of stars, planets, and galaxies, including very distant galaxies in the early Universe, and the physical conditions of molecular clouds. Its first results proved the telescope lives up to the ambitions of the scientists by providing access to the "cold Universe" with unprecedented sensitivity and image quality.

No fewer than 26 articles based on early science with APEX were published in July 2006 in a special issue of the research journal Astronomy and Astrophysics. Among the many new findings published then, most in the field of star formation and astrochemistry, are the discovery of a new interstellar molecule and the detection of light emitted at 0.2 mm from CO molecules, as well as light coming from a charged molecule composed of two forms of hydrogen.

Recent APEX observations lead to the first ever discovery of hydrogen peroxide in space, the first image of a dusty disc closely encircling a massive baby star, providing direct evidence that massive stars form in the same way as their smaller brethren, and the first direct measurements of the size and brightness of regions of star-birth in a very distant galaxy.

APEX is also involved in the Global mm-VLBI Network and in the Event Horizon Telescope (EHT). The EHT project produced the first direct image of a black hole. The detection in May 2012 of the quasar 3C 279 at 1.3 mm wavelength on the 9386 km baseline between APEX and the SMA in Hawaii has set the world-record in angular resolution: 28.6 micro-arcseconds

All ESO and Swedish APEX data are stored in the ESO archive. These data follow the standard ESO archive rules, i.e., they become publicly available one year after they have been delivered to the principal investigator of the project.

== Instruments ==
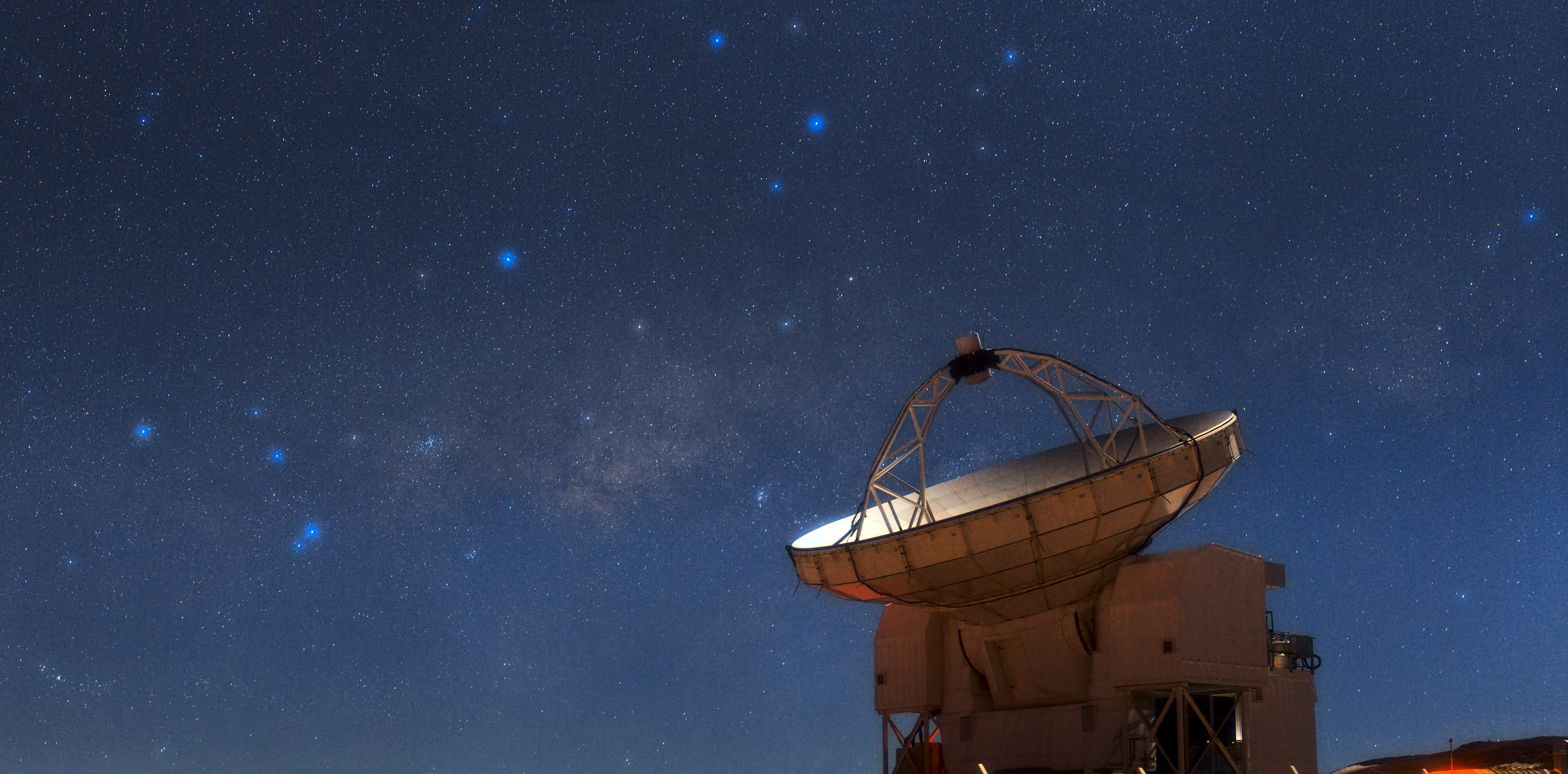
APEX Stands Sentry on Chajnantor

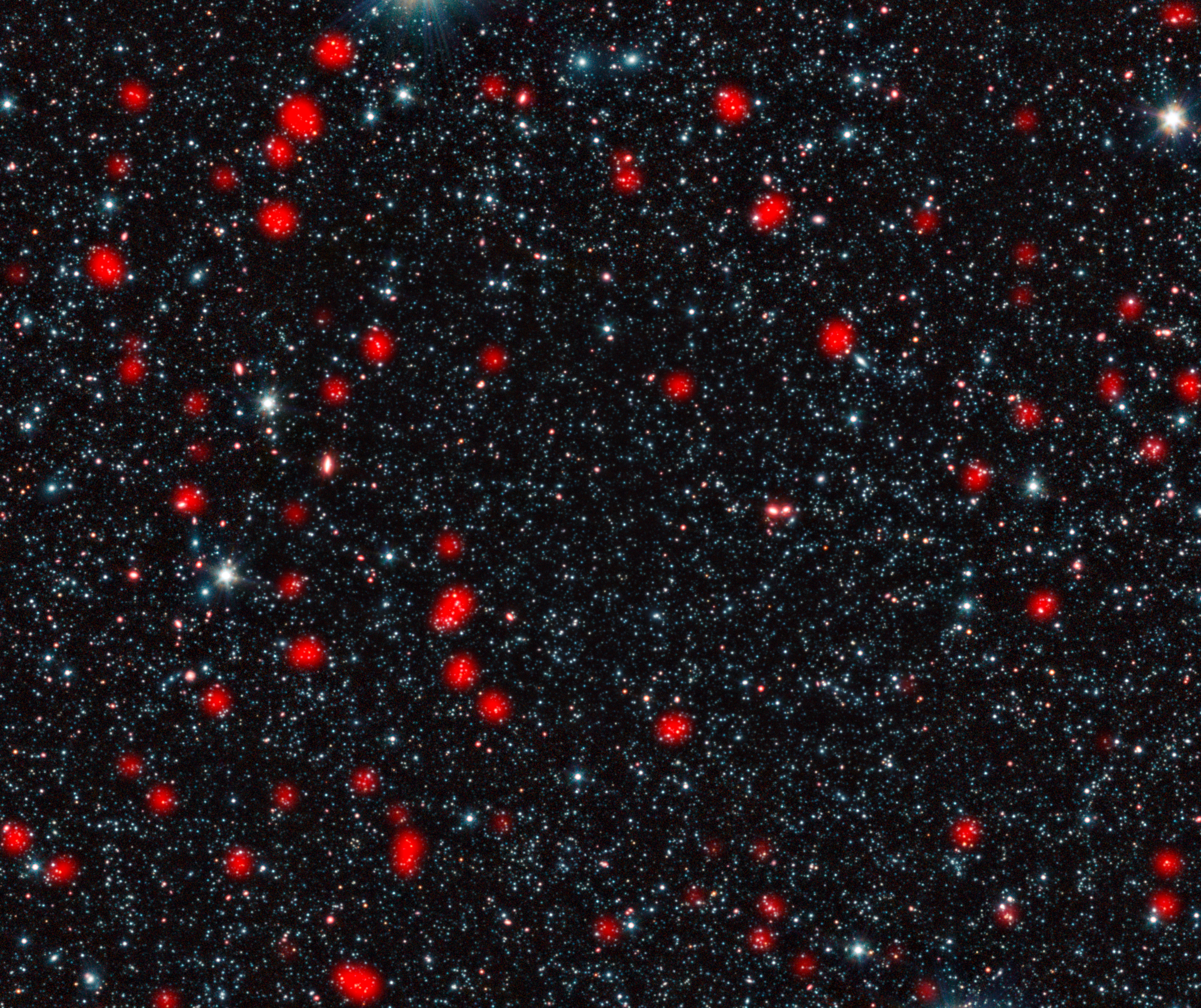
Combined APEX and Spitzer data in an area known as Extended Chandra Deep Field South

APEX, the largest submillimetre-wavelength single-dish telescope operating in the southern hemisphere, has a suite of instruments for astronomers to use in their observations, a major one being LABOCA, the Large APEX Bolometer Camera. LABOCA uses an array of extremely sensitive micro-calorimeters — known as bolometers — to detect submillimetre light. With almost 300 elements, at the time of commissioning in 2007 LABOCA has been the largest bolometer camera in the world. To be able to detect the tiny temperature changes caused by the faint submillimetre radiation, the bolometers are cooled to a fraction of a degree above absolute zero (300 millikelvins — minus 272.85 degrees Celsius). LABOCA's high sensitivity, together with its wide field of view (11 arcminutes, one third of the diameter of the full Moon), make it an invaluable tool for imaging the submillimetre Universe.

APEX first light was achieved in May 2004 using the SEST Imaging Bolometer Array (SIMBA) that had been moved to APEX after the decommissioning of the SEST and the first radio pointing model was compiled. At the time of the inauguration in 2005, APEX was equipped with state-of-the-art sub-millimetre spectrometers developed by MPIfR's Division for Sub-Millimetre Technology and followed by the first facility receiver built at Chalmers University (OSO).

For more information about APEX instruments, consult the instrumentation page.

== Technology ==
To operate at the shorter sub-millimetre wavelengths, APEX presents a surface of exceedingly high quality. After a series of high precision adjustments, the surface of the primary mirror can be adjusted with remarkable precision. Over the 12 m diameter of the antenna, the rms deviation from the perfect parabola is less than 17 thousandths of a millimetre. This is smaller than one fifth of the average thickness of a human hair.

The APEX telescope is made up of three "receiver" cabins: Cassegrain, Nasmyth A, and Nasmyth B.

== Gallery ==
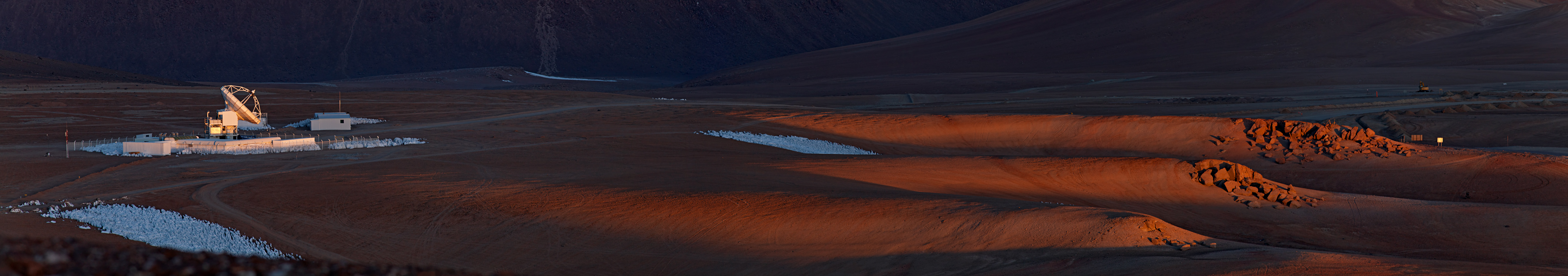
Panoramic view of the plateau

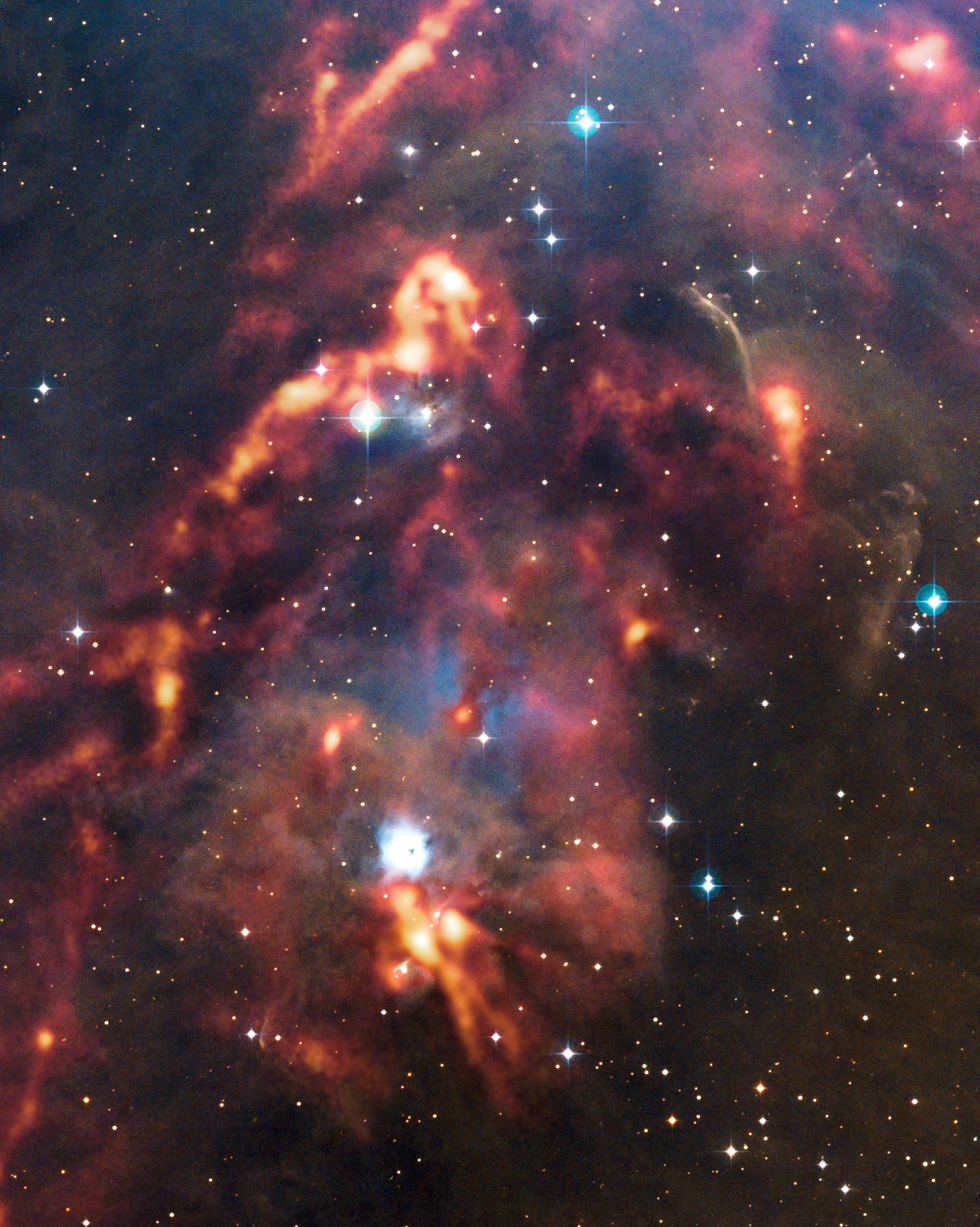
Setting the Dark on Fire

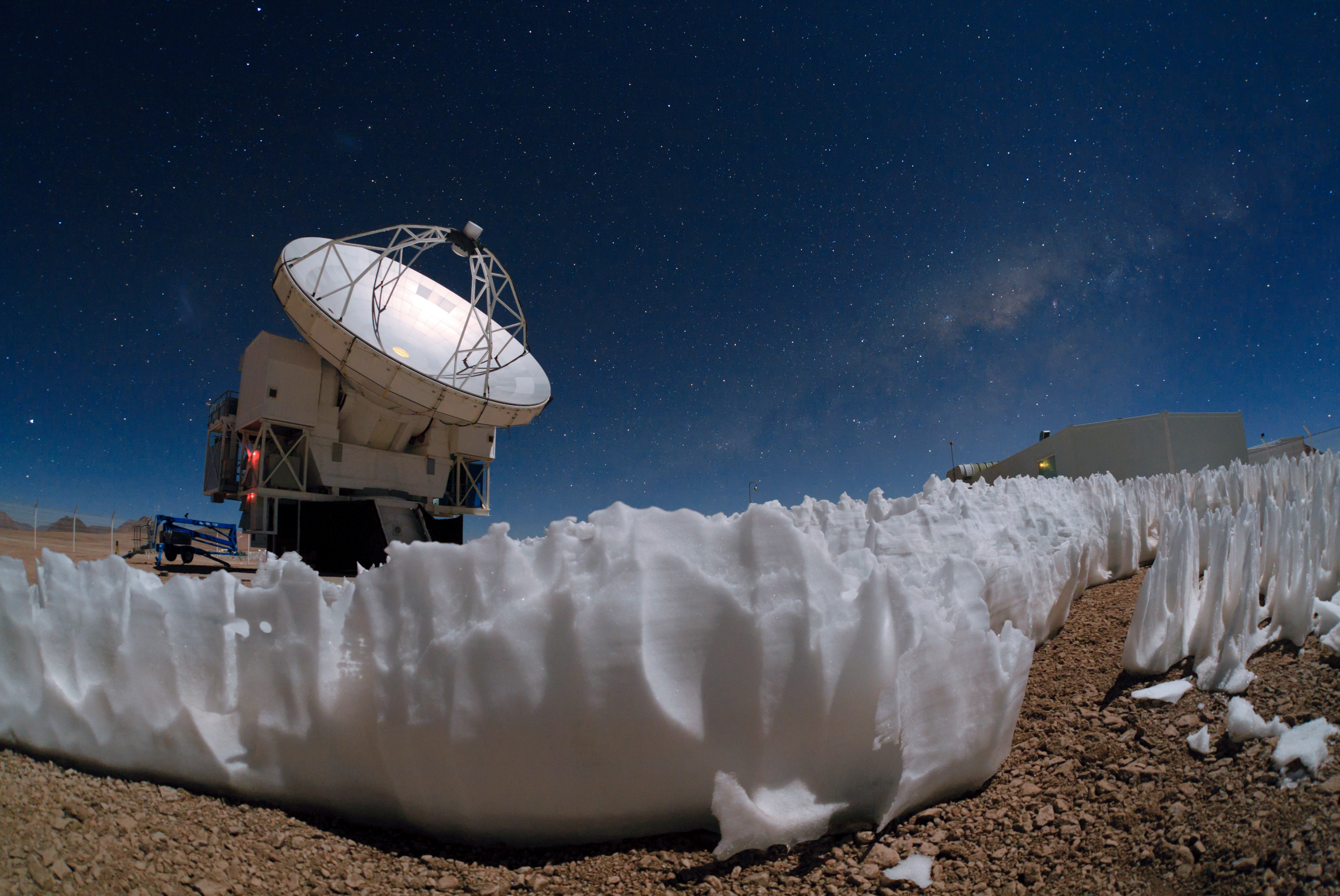
APEX and clusters of white penitentes

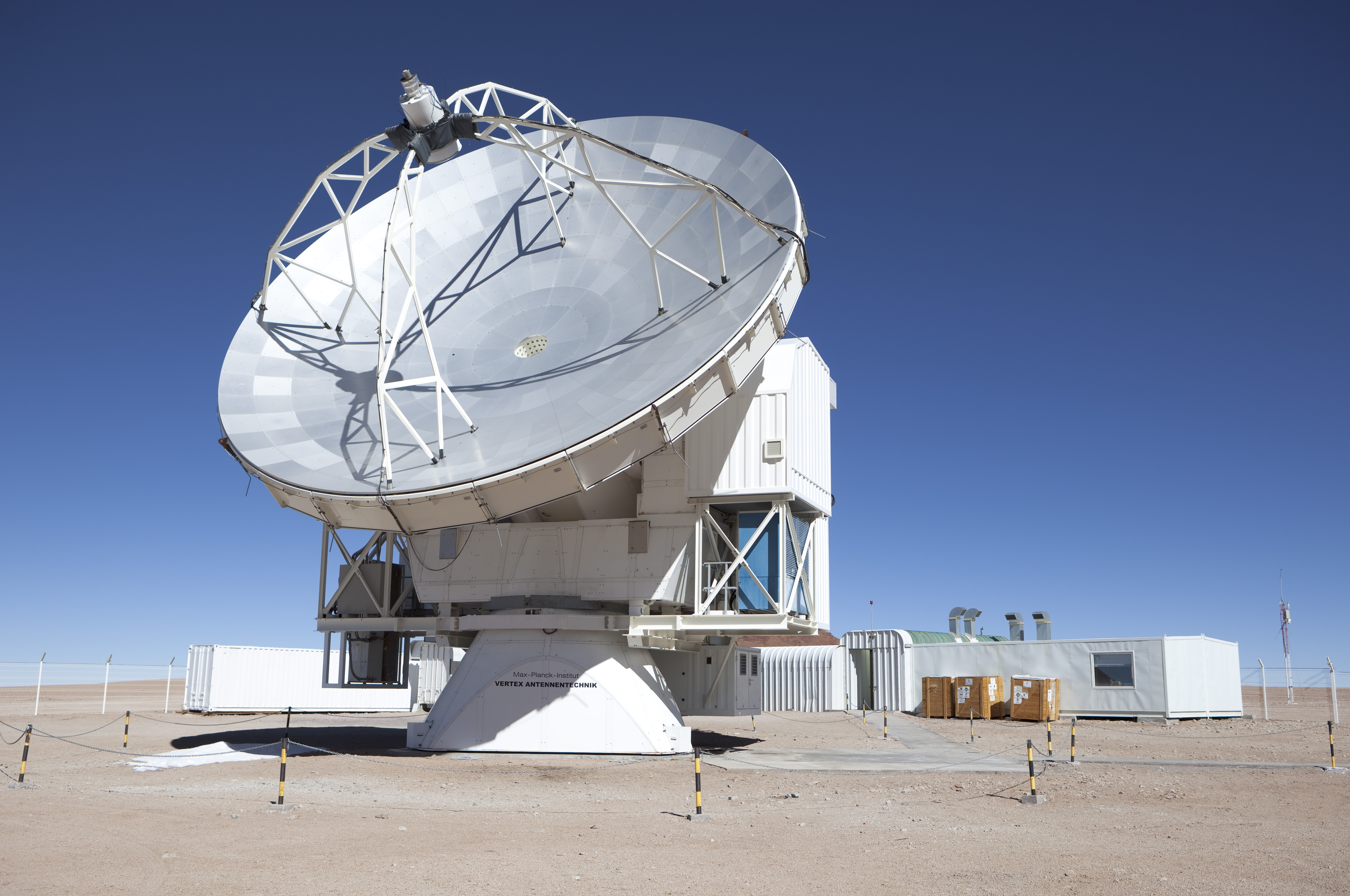
The APEX Antenna

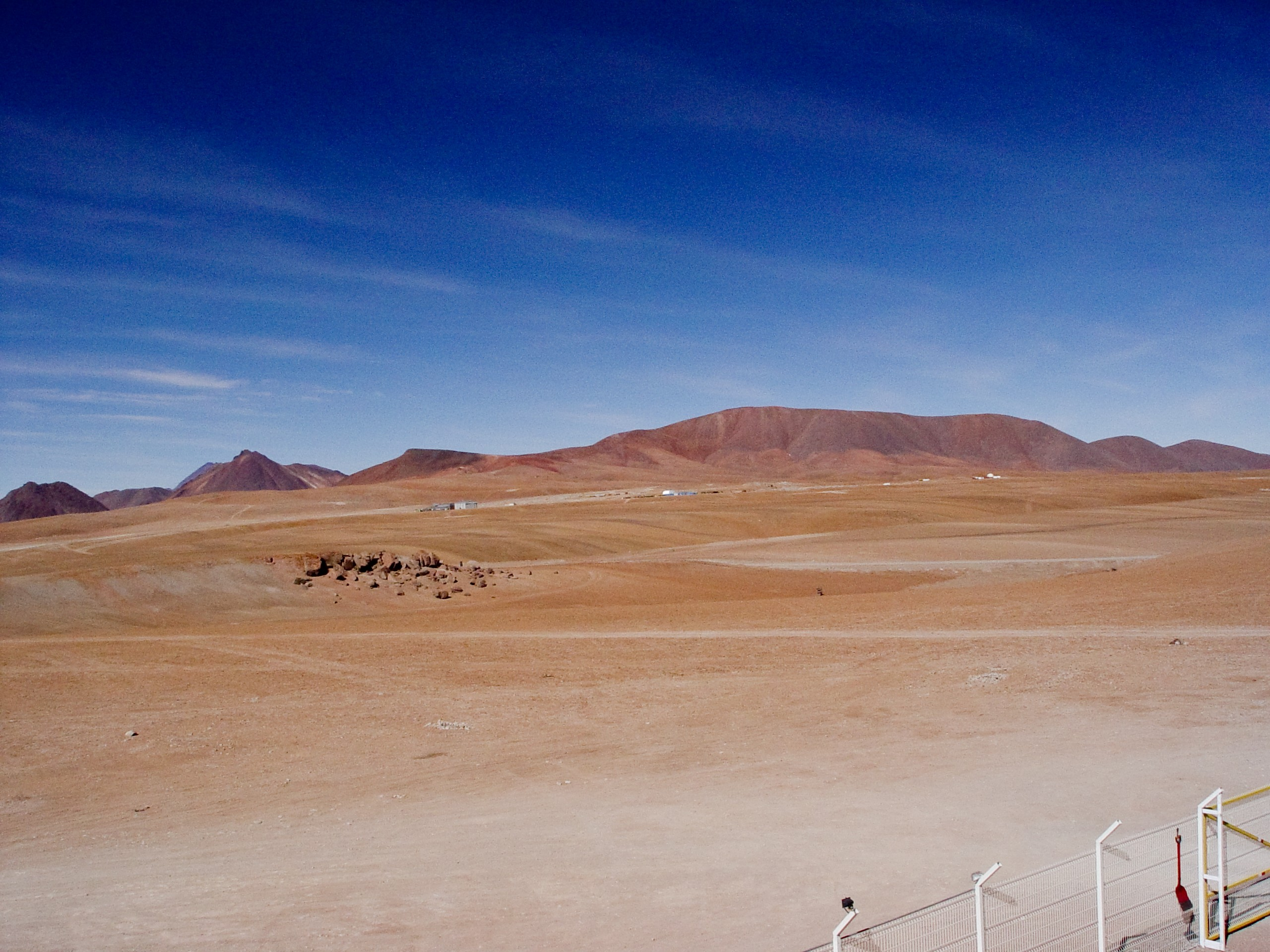
Looking over to the ALMA site

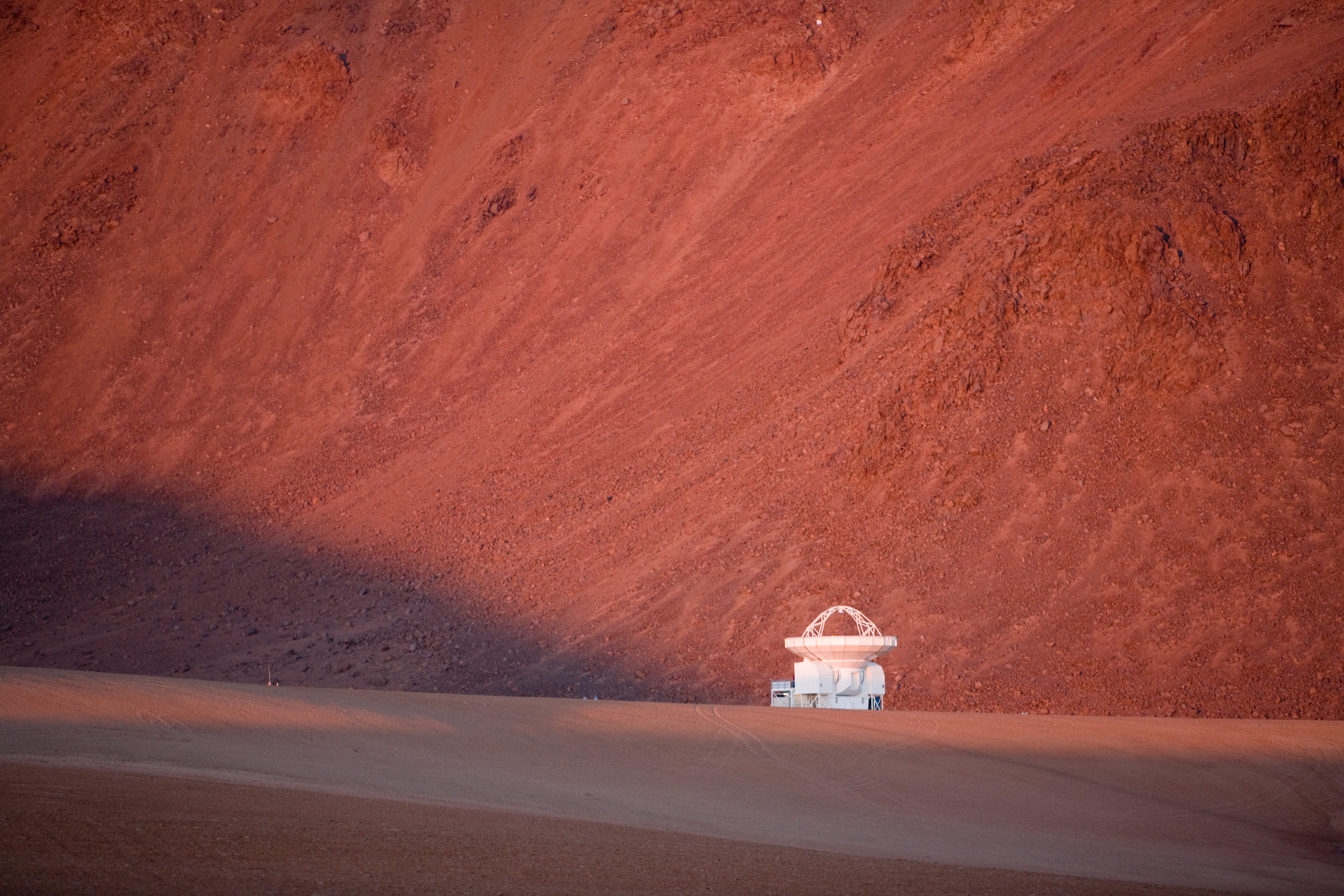
APEX at Chajnantor

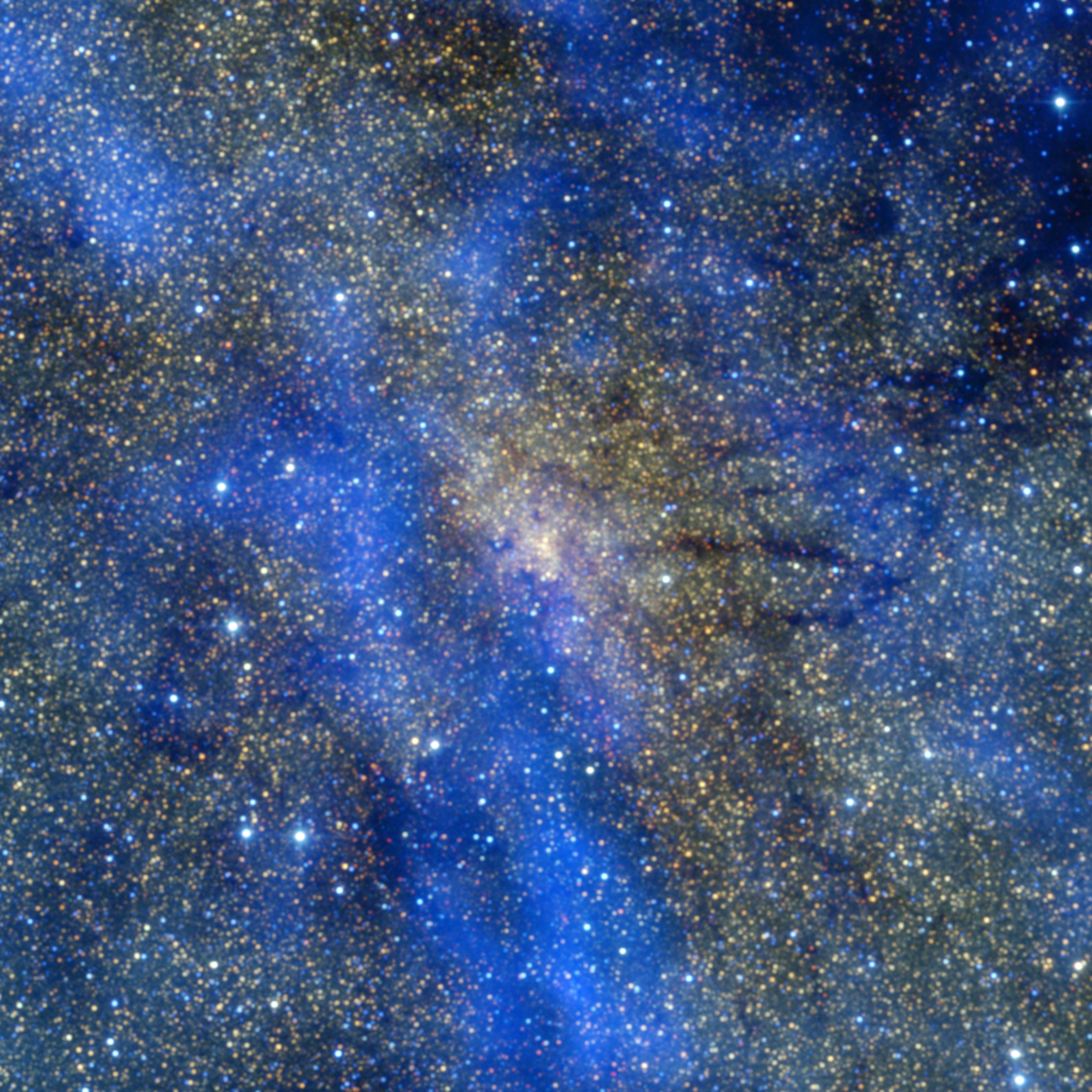
Central region of the Milky Way (LABOCA on APEX)

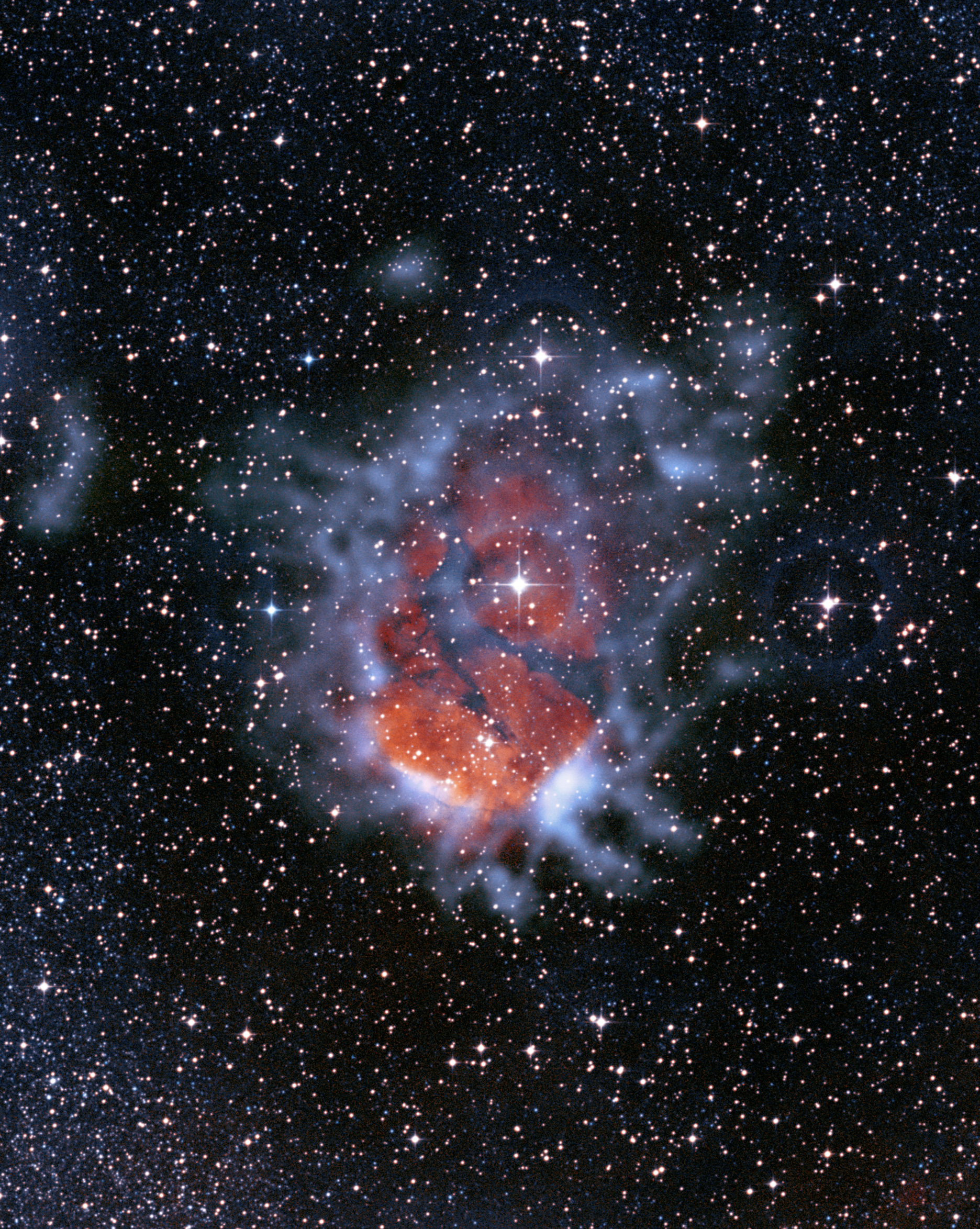
Colour composite image of RCW 120 (LABOCA)

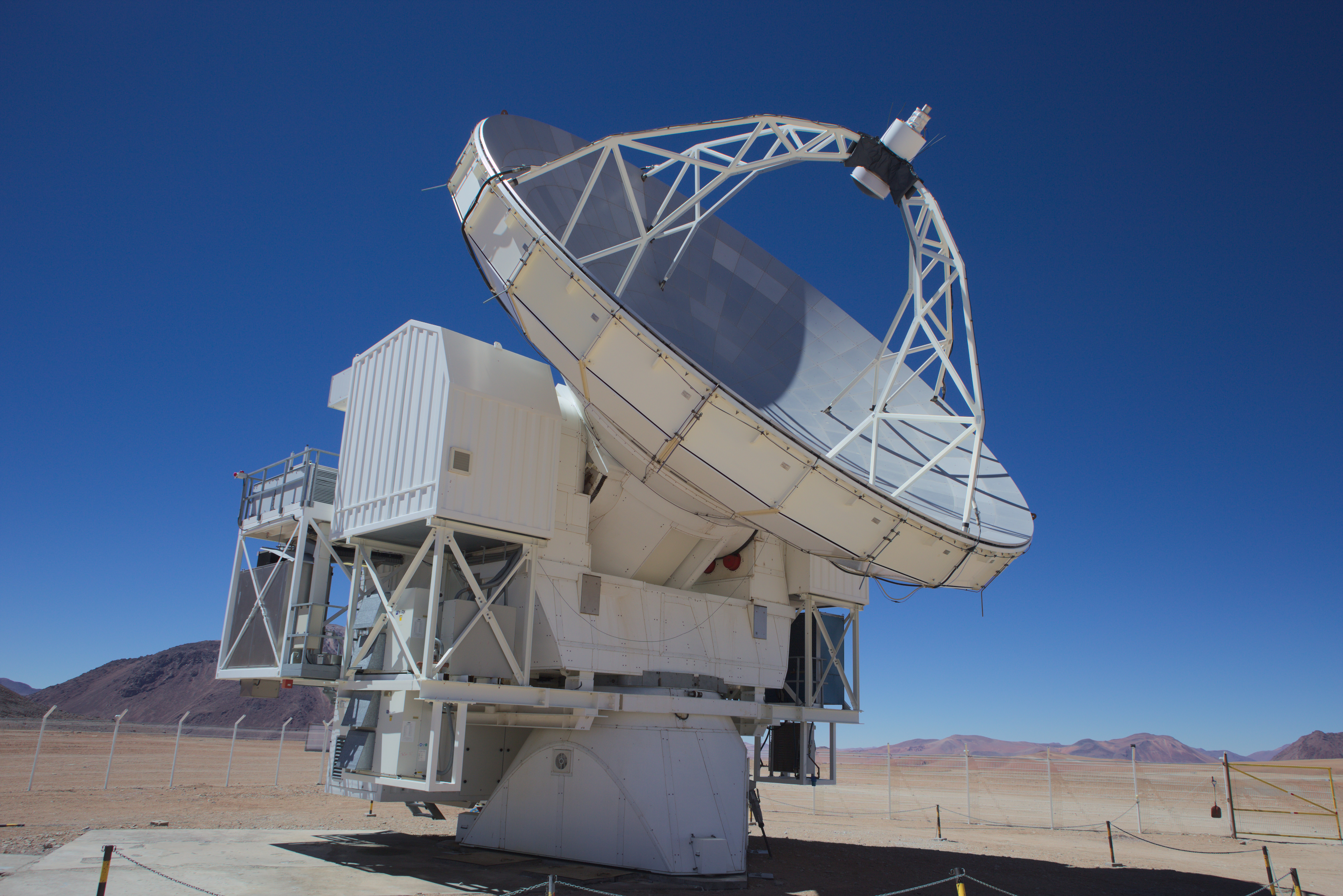
APEX 12m Telescope

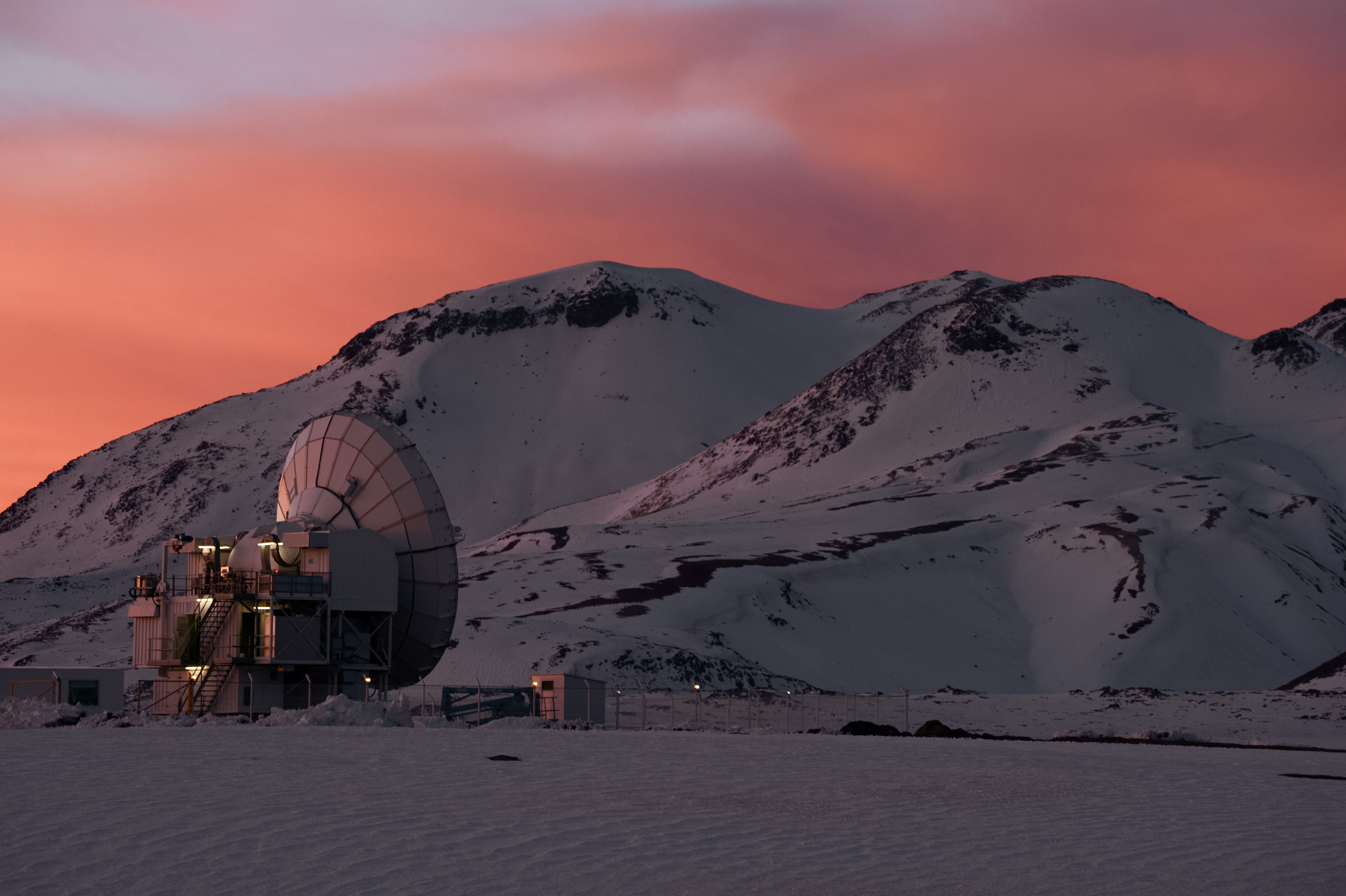
APEX and snowy Chajnantor

This video shows the construction of part of APEX as well as the way from APEX at the Chajnantor plateau to the APEX Sequitor base, located nearby San Pedro de Atacama in Chile.
