= Sh 2-27 =

Emission nebula in constellation Ophiuchus

Sharpless 2-27
Emission nebula
- H II region
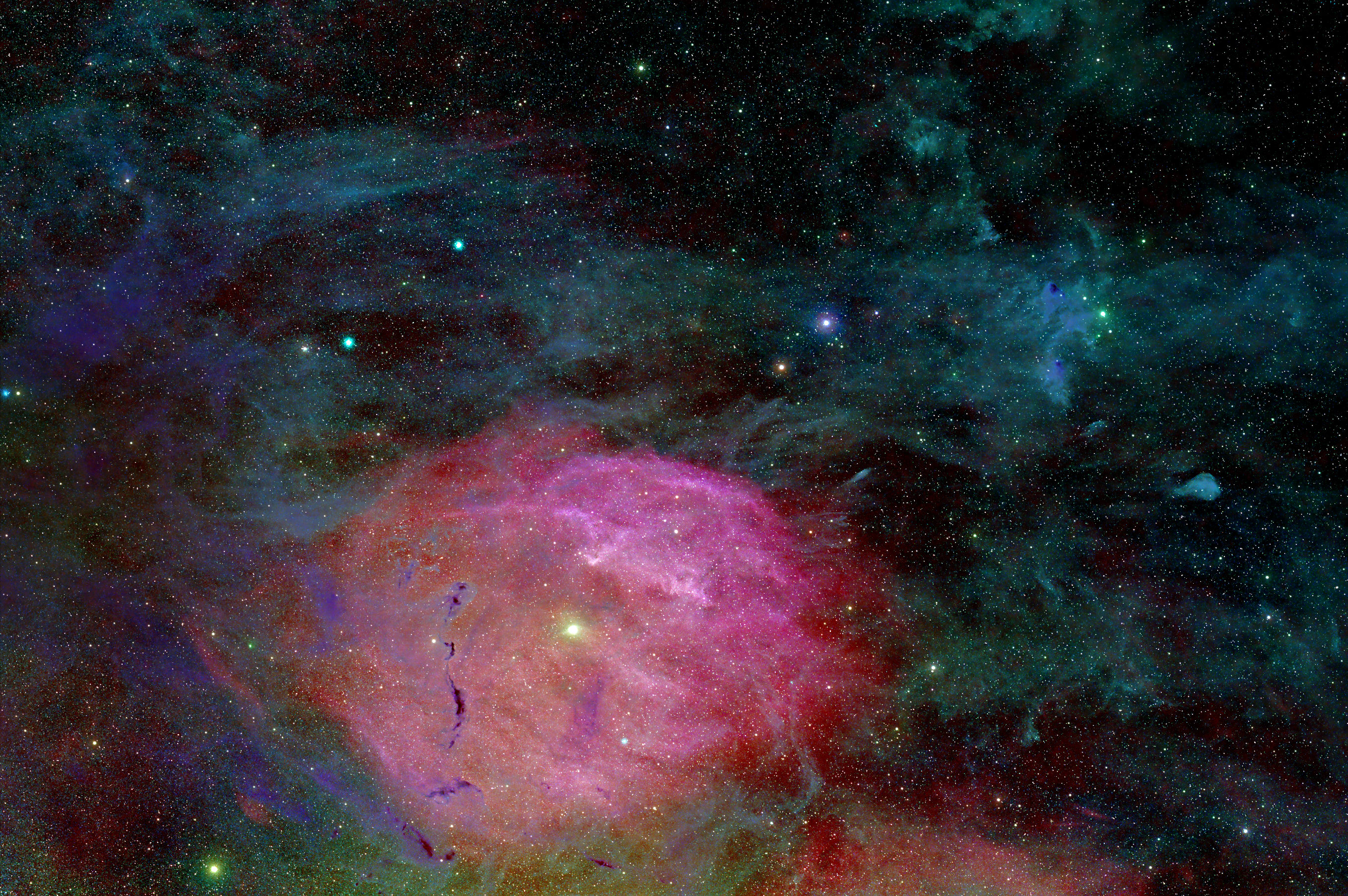
- Sh 2-27 (pink) embedded within molecular clouds (green and blue), imaged by the Northern Sky Narrowband Survey.

Observation data: J2000 epoch
- Right ascension: 16^{h} 35^{m} 56^{s}
- Declination: −12° 43′ 05″
- Distance: 440 ly
- Apparent magnitude (V): 17.3
- Apparent dimensions (V): 10° x 15°
- Constellation: Ophiuchus

Physical characteristics
- Radius: 78 ly
- Dimensions: 480' x 480'
- Designations: LBN 24, Gum 73, Cobold Nebula, Zeta Ophiuchi Nebula

Sh 2-27 (also known as the Cobold Nebula or the Zeta Ophiuchi Nebula), is an emission nebula in the constellation Ophiuchus. It is ionized by the star Zeta Ophiuchi, which lies near its center. The star is a runaway that produces a notable bow shock.

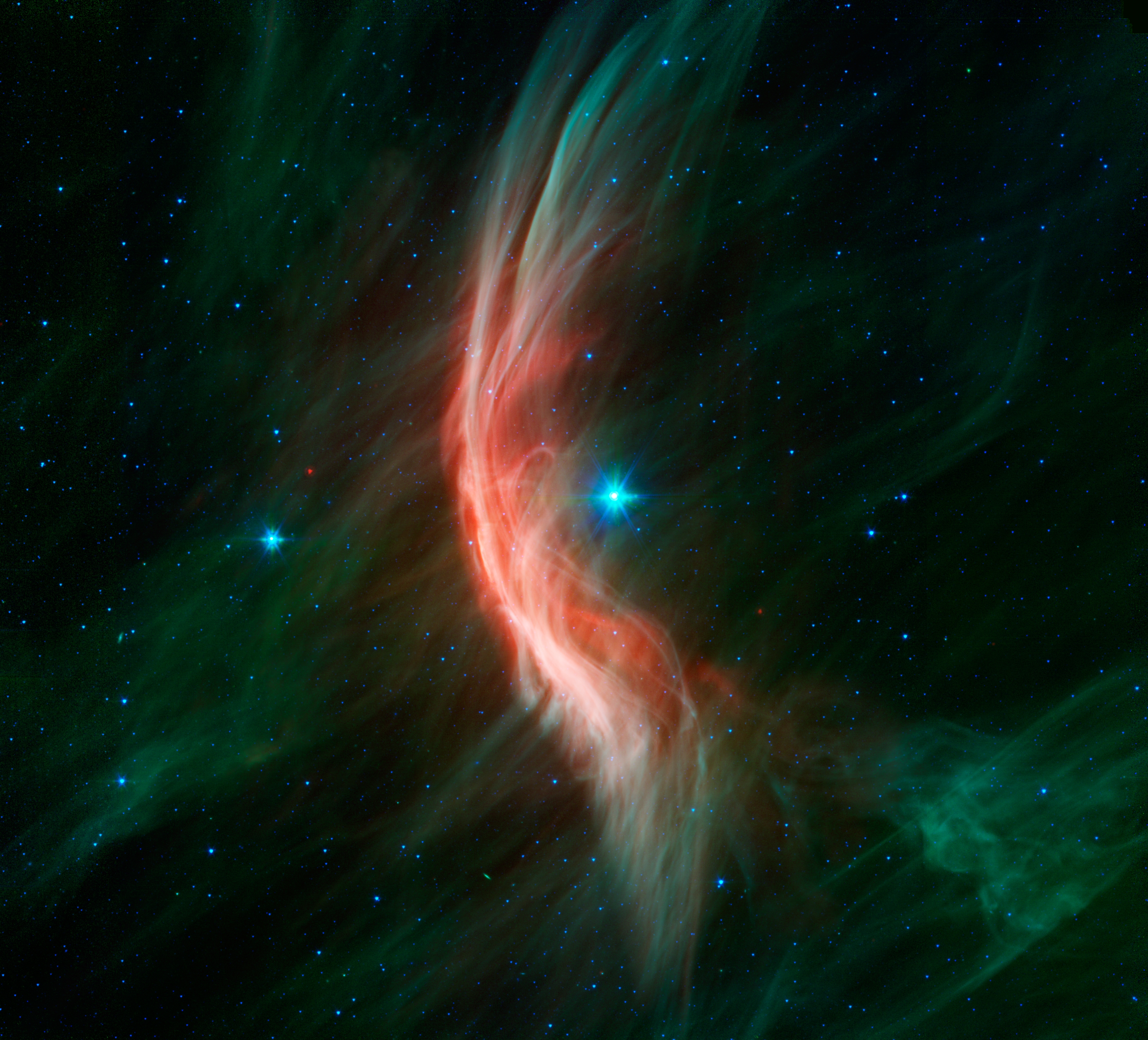
The bow shock around the runaway star Zeta Ophiuchi, imaged by NASA’s Spitzer Space Telescope.

The nebula is embedded within the Rho Ophiuchi cloud complex and can be classified as an H II region. Its distance of only about 440 light-years, determined from Gaia parallax measurements of Zeta Ophiuchi, makes it one of the closest known emission nebulae. This proximity is also the reason for its large apparent size of approximately 15° × 10°, even though the nebula itself is relatively faint.
