= Sh 2-22 =

Emission nebula

Sharpless 2-22
Emission nebula
- H II region
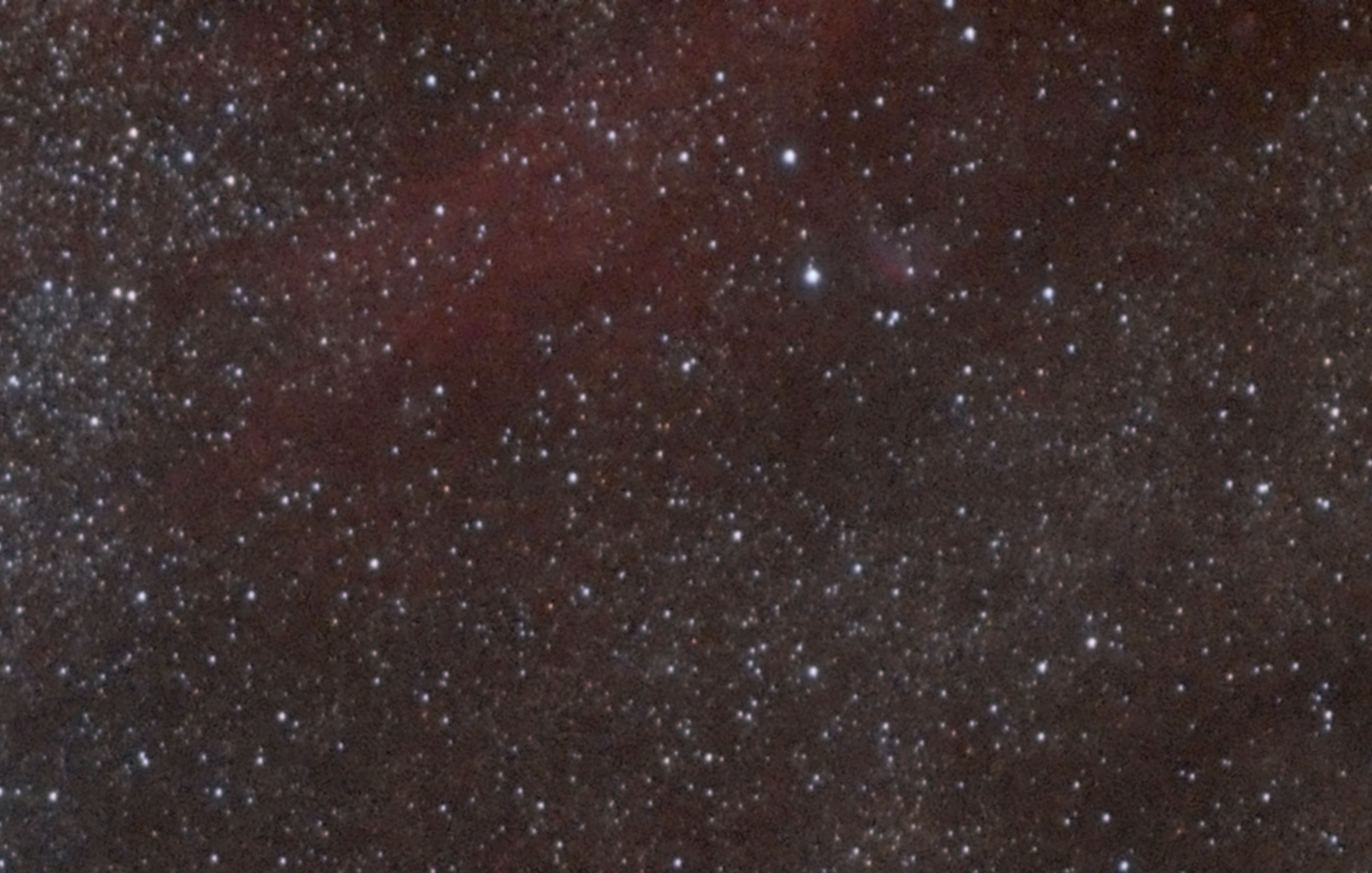
- As seen in 2022

Observation data: J2000 epoch
- Right ascension: 17^{h} 55^{m} 06^{s}
- Declination: −25° 01′ 00″
- Distance: 799 pc
- Apparent magnitude (V): 15.94
- Apparent diameter: 60' x 60'
- Constellation: Sagittarius

Physical characteristics
- Radius: 68 ly
- Designations: RCW 144, Gum 71, LBN 14

Sh 2-22 is an emission nebula in the constellation Sagittarius. It is part of the Sharpless Catalog assembled by Stewart Sharpless. The nebula appears to surround 63 Ophiuchi, however, 63 Ophiuchi and the star's corresponding ring nebula around it are unrelated to Sh 2-22.
