= Sh 2-15 =

Emission nebula

Sharpless 2-15
Emission nebula
- H II region
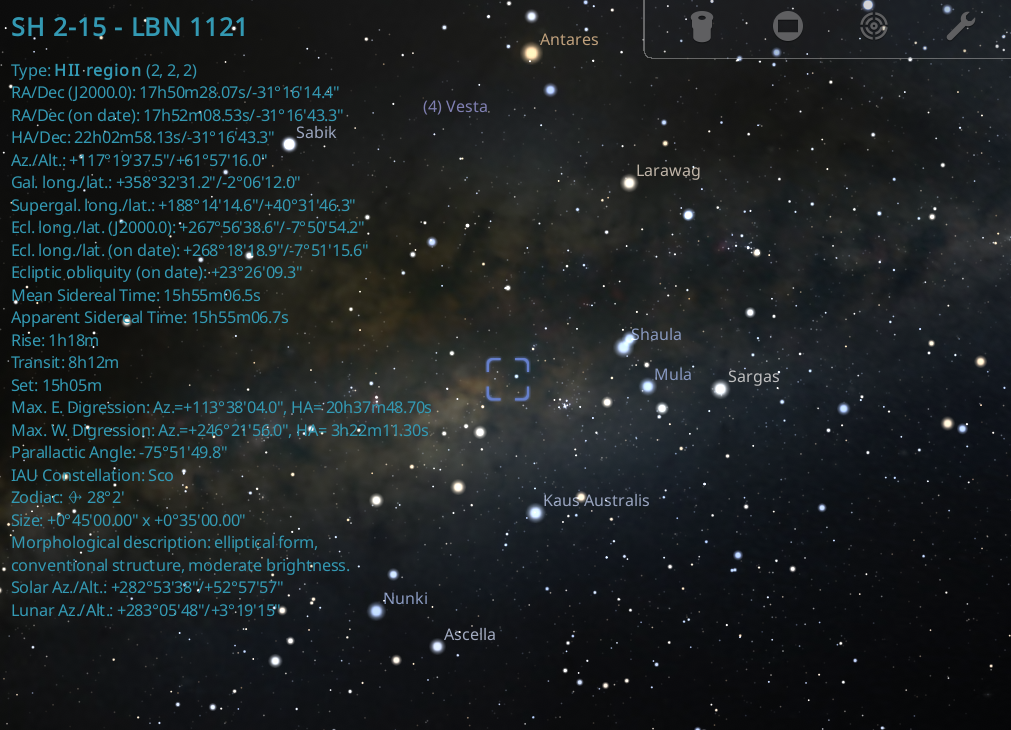
- The location of Sh 2-15 in the sky, (in the open source Stellarium software)

Observation data: epoch
- Right ascension: 17^{h} 50^{m} 30^{s}
- Declination: −31° 16′ 00″
- Apparent magnitude (V): 16.65
- Apparent diameter: 30'
- Constellation: Scorpius
- Designations: RCW 134, Gum 69, W25, LBN 1121

Sh 2-15 is an emission nebula in the constellation of Scorpius. It is ionized by the star HD 161853. It is most visible using a Hydrogen-alpha filter.
