= RCW 120 =

Emission nebula

Emission nebula
- H II region
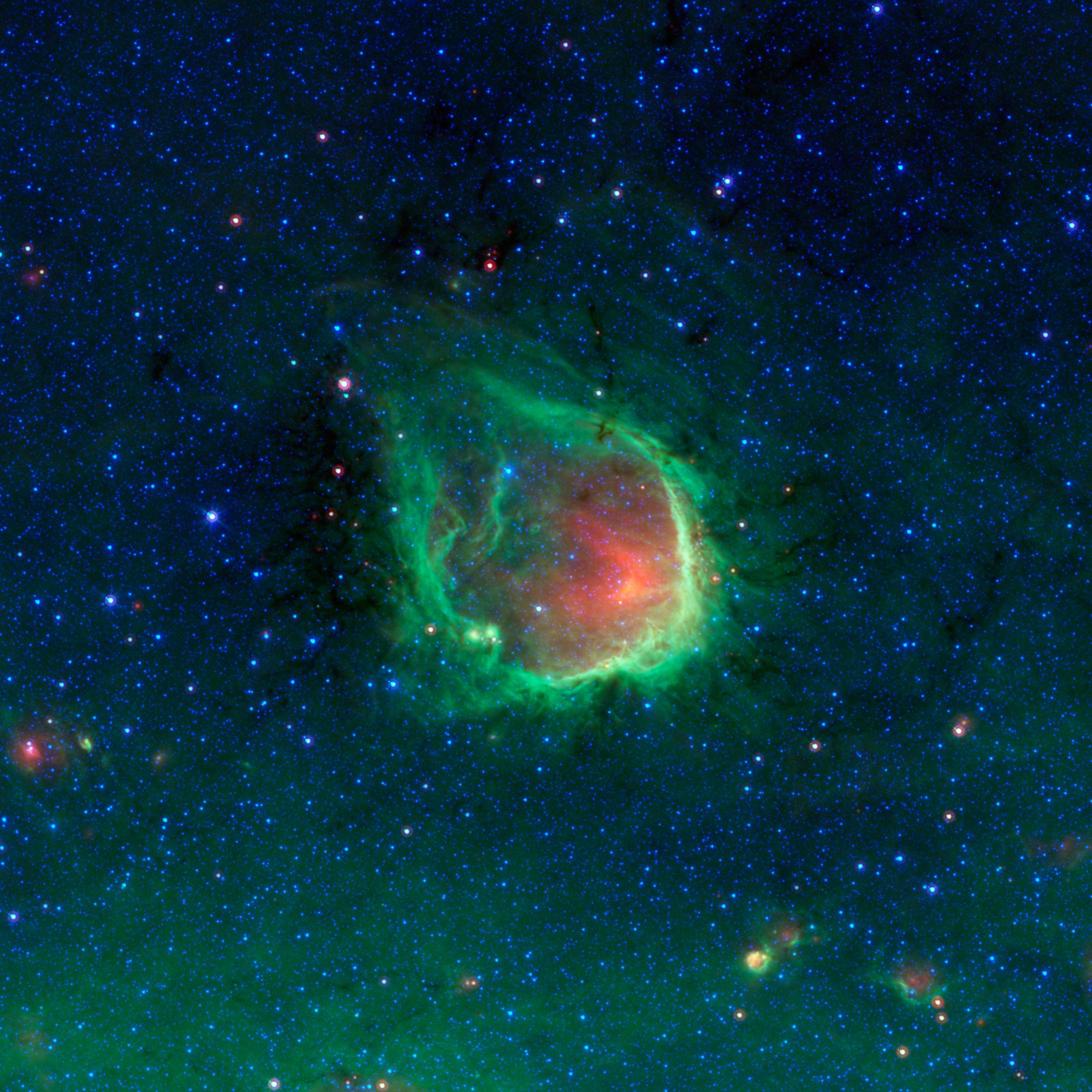
- RCW 120 imaged by Spitzer Space Telescope

Observation data: J2000 epoch
- Right ascension: 17^{h} 12^{m} 23.2^{s}
- Declination: −38° 26′ 51.2″
- Distance: 4,300 ly
- Constellation: Scorpius
- Designations: GUM 58; Sh 2-3; Green Ring Nebula

RCW 120 is an emission nebula and H II region in the southern Milky Way and located some 4,300 light-years from Earth.

Its designation appears in the RCW Catalogue published in 1960, whose circular diameter size is 6 arcmin. It also catalogued as Sh 2-3 and Gum 58.

Veta S. Avedisova considers RCW 120 is being ionised by the O8 V star CD -38 11636 and places the nebula in the star formation region SFR 348.26+0.47 along with 3 Astrophysical maser CH87 347.386+0.266.

The Herschel infra-red telescope's image shows an embryonic star that is likely to become one of the brightest stars in our Galaxy at some time within the next few hundred thousand years. The star now appears about ten times more massive than the Sun and may grow much larger by accreting material from the surrounding gas and dust.

== Gallery ==
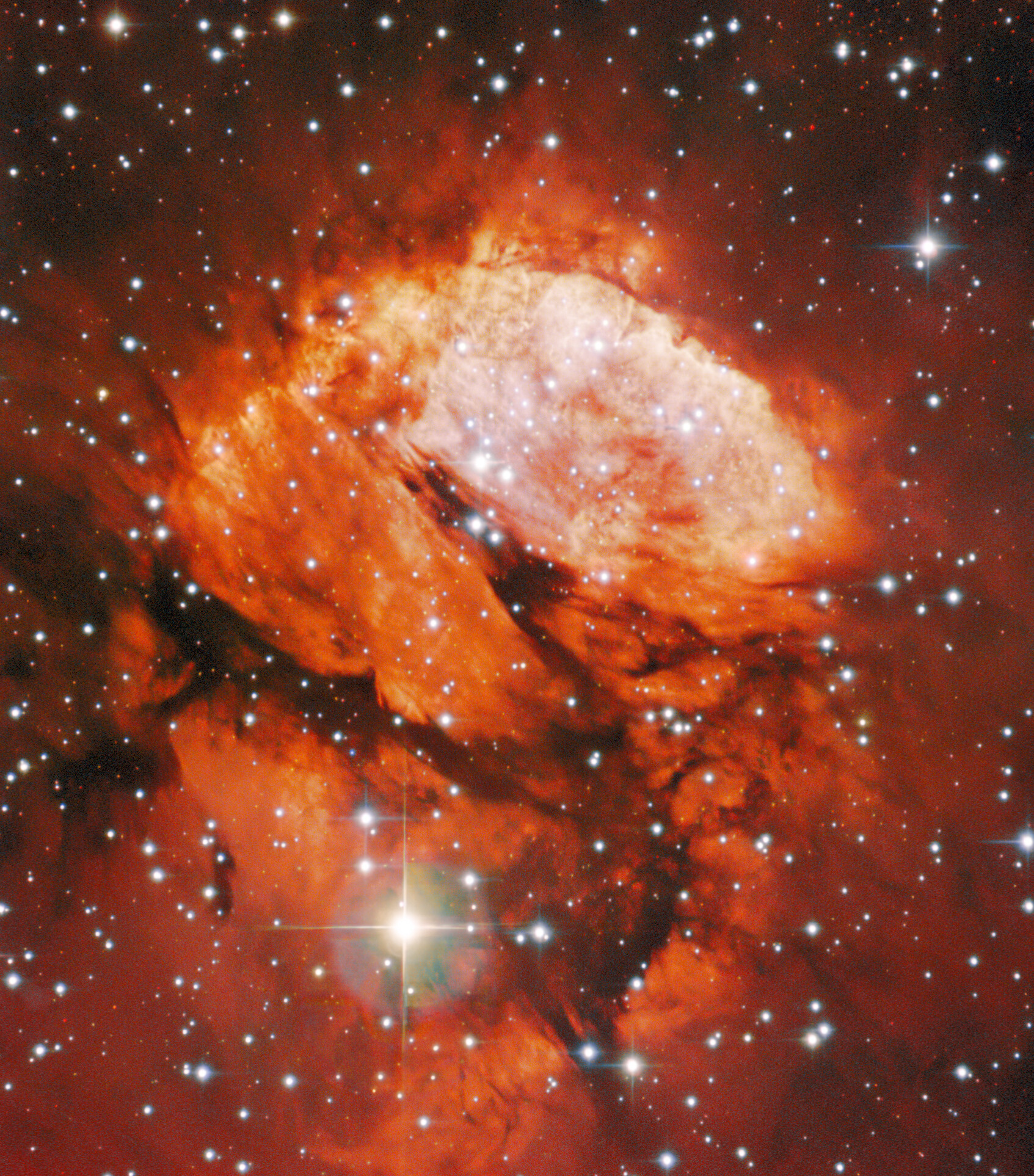
RCW 120, also known as Sharpless 2-3, was captured by the SMARTS 0.9-meter Telescope at Cerro Tololo Inter-American Observatory.
