= Colin Stanley Gum =

Australian astronomer (1924–1960)

Colin Stanley Gum (4 June 1924 – 29 April 1960) was an Australian astronomer known for his cataloguing of emission nebulae and the publication of his findings. This catalogue is called the Gum catalogue.

== Early life and education ==
Gum was born at Quambi Hospital in Adelaide, South Australia, son of Stanley Sturt Edgar Gum and Ivy Olive (née Storr), of Appila, South Australia. His father, a farmer who had served as a private in the Australian Imperial Force during the First World War, died before Colin's birth.

Gum received his BSc honours degree from the University of Adelaide in 1949, going directly to the Mount Stromlo Observatory, based upon work conducted at which he was awarded his MSc from the University of Adelaide in 1951. He was awarded his PhD in 1955 by the Australian National University, one of the first recipients of this degree from that institution.

== Career ==
Gum catalogued emission nebulae in the southern sky at the Mount Stromlo Observatory using wide field photography. Gum published his findings in 1955 in a study entitled A study of diffuse southern H-alpha nebulae which presented a catalog, now known as the Gum catalog, of 85 nebulae or nebular complexes. Gum 12, a large area of nebulosity in the direction of the constellations Puppis and Vela, was later named the Gum Nebula in his honour. Gum was part of the team, whose number included Frank John Kerr and Gart Westerhout, that determined the precise position of the neutral hydrogen plane in space.

Gum was appointed Head of the Observational Optical Astronomy programme at the University of Sydney in 1959. He died in a skiing accident at Zermatt, Switzerland the following year. He was the brother-in-law of academic Fay Gale. The crater Gum on the Moon is named after him.
