= Frank John Kerr =

Australian astronomer and physicist

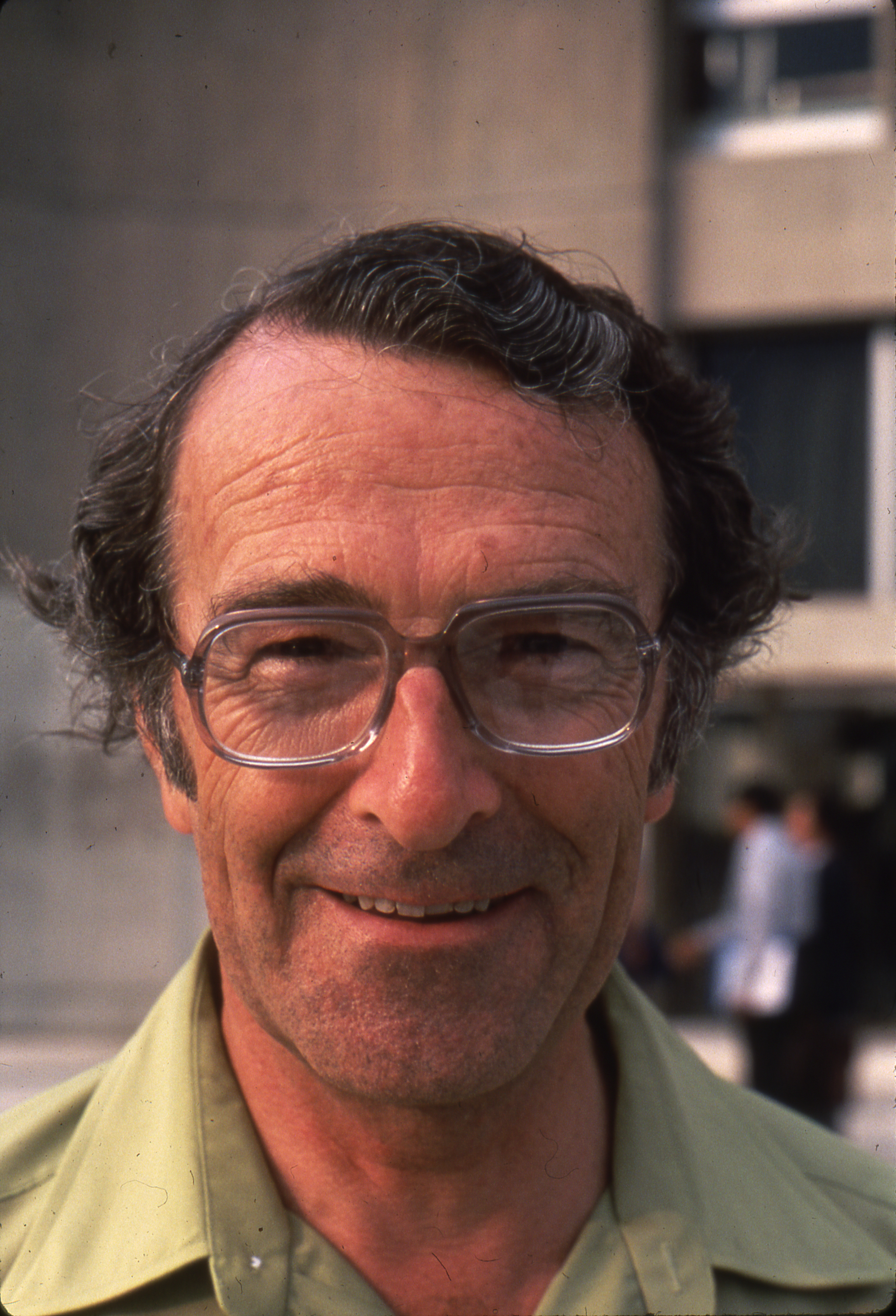
- Kerr in 1976
- Born: Frank John Kerr; January 8, 1918; St Albans, England, UK
- Died: September 15, 2000 (aged 82); Silver Spring, Maryland, US
- Education: University of Melbourne, Harvard University
- Scientific career
- Fields: astronomy
- Institutions: CSIRO, University of Maryland, College Park

Frank John Kerr (8 January 1918 – 15 September 2000) was an Australian astronomer and physicist who made contributions to human understanding of the galactic structure of the Milky Way. Born in St Albans to Australian parents, Kerr returned with his family to Australia after the completion of World War I. He received degrees in physics at the University of Melbourne and an MA in astronomy from Harvard University (1951).

In 1940, Frank had joined the Commonwealth Scientific and Industrial Research Organisation (CSIRO) radiophysics laboratory in Sydney, Australia under the mentorship of Joseph Lade Pawsey. He pioneered the use of the magnetron, and also studied superrefraction.

In late 1951, Kerr used a specially built 36-foot transit telescope, the largest dish of its kind in Australia, and started mapping the Magellanic Clouds, discovering considerable amounts of neutral hydrogen and an extended envelope around both clouds. From 1954 to 1955, Kerr was a member of the team that determined the rotation of the Magellanic Clouds and their masses. Kerr coined the term "galactic warp" to refer to the distorting effect of the Magellanic Clouds' gravity on the shape of our own galaxy.

Over the years he worked with various astronomers, including Colin Gum and Gart Westerhout.

From 1966 to 1979, he was a visiting, then full, professor of astronomy at the University of Maryland, College Park. Kerr was the Director of the Astronomy Program during the mid-1970s. From 1978 to 1985, Kerr then acted as the Provost of the Mathematical and Physical Sciences and Engineering Division at the University of Maryland.

He died of cancer at Silver Spring, Maryland.
