= RCW 7 =

Emission nebula in the constellation Puppis

Nebula
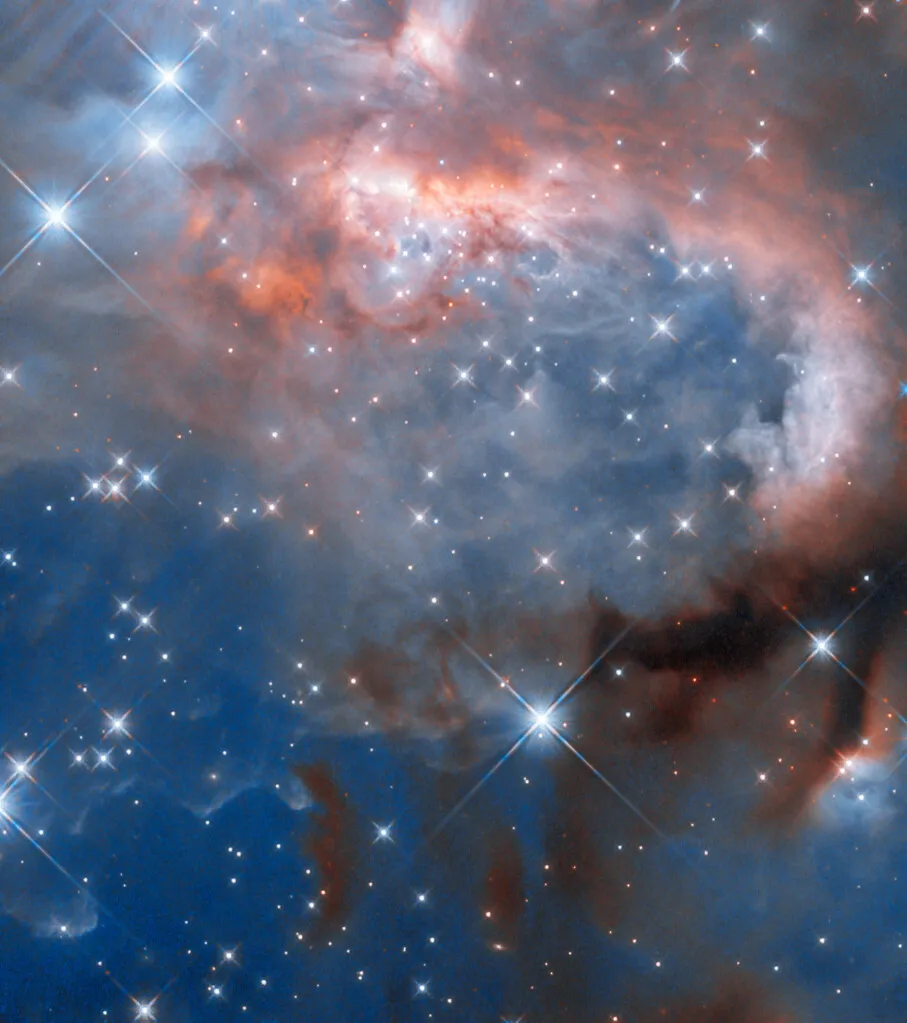
- RCW 7 imaged by the Hubble Space Telescope

Observation data: J2000.0 epoch
- Right ascension: 7ʰ 32ᵐ 7.57ˢ
- Declination: −16° 58' 39.55"
- Distance: 5,300 ly
- Constellation: Puppis

RCW 7, also known as Sh 2-302 and Gum 6, is an H II region 5,300 light-years from the Solar System, in the constellation Puppis. The nebula contains a large binary protostar named IRAS 07299-1651.

== See also ==
- RCW Catalogue
