= Sh 2-48 =

Diffuse nebula

Sharpless 2-48
Nebula
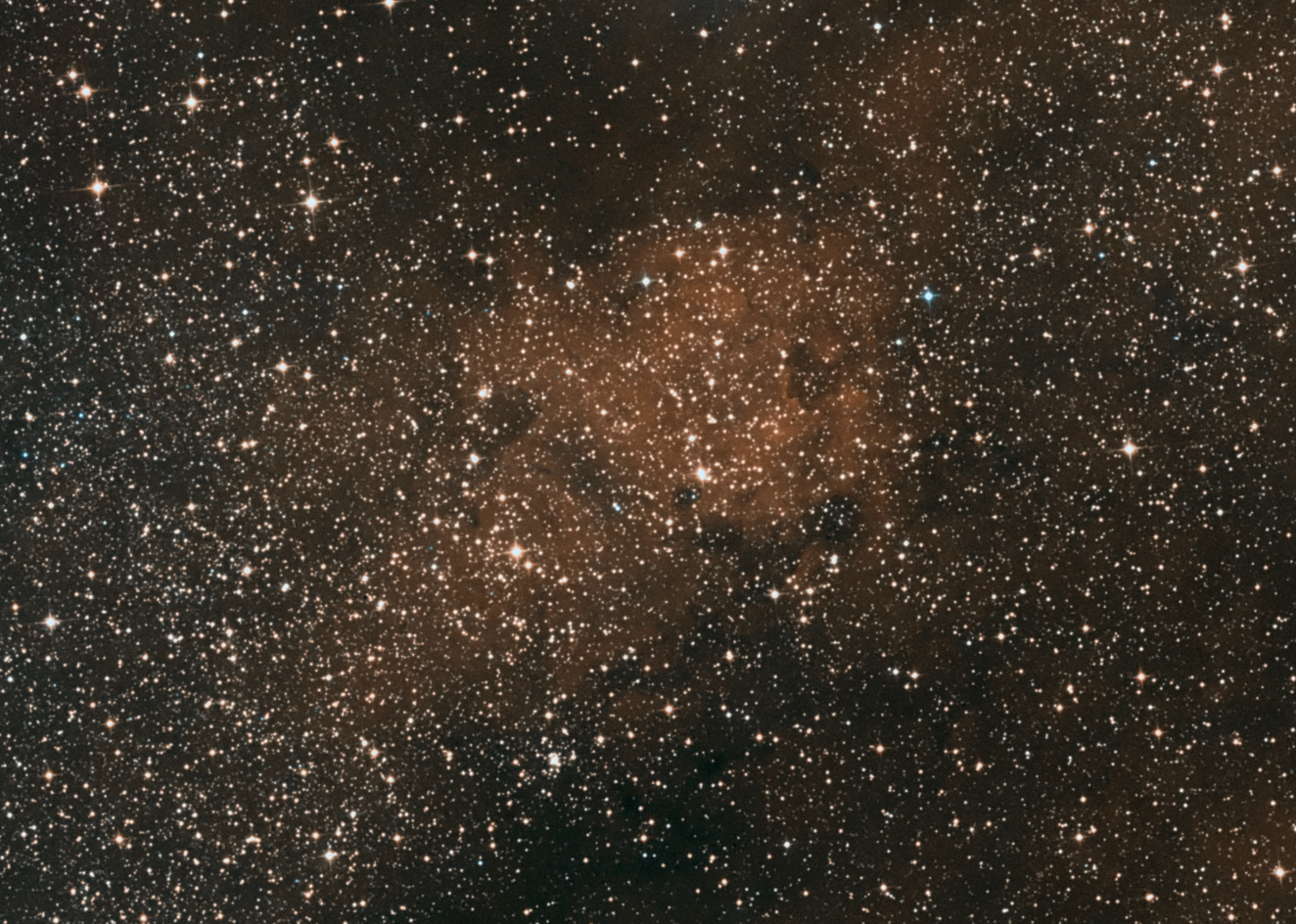

Observation data: epoch
- Right ascension: 18^{h} 19^{m}
- Declination: −14° 36′ ″
- Distance: 3838 pc
- Constellation: Scutum
- Designations: RCW 162, Gum 82, LBN 64

Sh 2-48 is a diffuse nebula in Scutum. It is often overlooked due to proximity to the much more famous Eagle Nebula.

The open cluster Kronberger 25 is in the direction of the nebula, however it is likely a foreground object.
