= Sh 2-307 =

Molecular cloud

Sharpless 2-307
Nebula

Observation data: J2000 epoch
- Right ascension: 07^{h} 35^{m} 32^{s}
- Declination: −18° 45′ 33″
- Distance: 2650 pc
- Apparent magnitude (V): 15.17
- Apparent dimensions (V): 6' x 6'
- Constellation: Puppis
- Designations: BRAN 50, Gum 7, IRAS 07333-1838, RCW 12, LBN 1051

Sh 2-307 is a nebula in Puppis. It contains the potential infrared cluster [DBS2003] 8. It is located in the Perseus Arm. Although appearing small visually, longer exposure will reveal the bright area is only the central portion of the nebula, and it is much larger.
