= NGC 2899 =

Planetary nebula in the constellation Vela

Emission nebula
- Planetary nebula
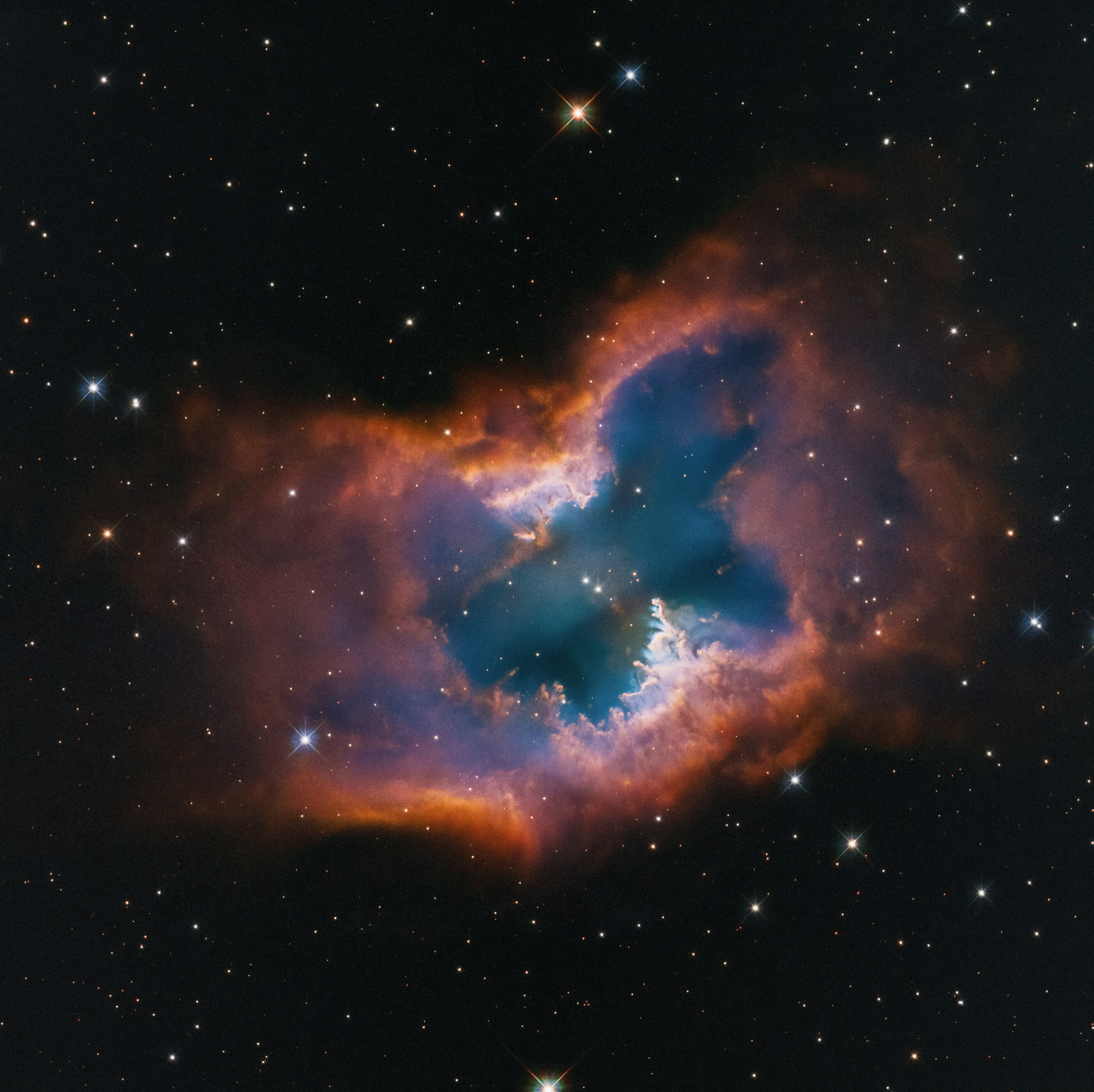
- NGC 2899, imaged by the Hubble Space Telescope

Observation data: J2000 epoch
- Right ascension: 09^{h} 27^{m} 03.2^{s}
- Declination: −56° 06′ 21.1″
- Distance: 3,350 ± 670 ly (1,026 ± 205 pc) ly
- Apparent magnitude (V): 11.8
- Apparent dimensions (V): 2.6′ × 1.3′
- Constellation: Vela
- Designations: NGC 2899, Gum 27, PN G277.1-03.8

NGC 2899 is a planetary nebula in the southern constellation of Vela. It was discovered by English astronomer John Herschel on February 27, 1835. This nebula can be viewed with a moderate-sized amateur telescope, but requires a larger telescope to resolve details. NGC 2899 is located at a distance of 3,350 ± 670 light-years (1,026 ± 205 pc) from the Sun and 25,894 ± 3 light-years (7,939 ± 1 pc) from the Galactic Center.

This nebula has an overall kidney shape that is elongated along an axis from WNW to ESE. The overall topology is bipolar with a significant equatorial structure. This shape is believed to result from a binary star system. The mean expansion rate is 43 to 56 km/s, with high velocity structures expanding at 110 to 130 km/s. The core mass of the central star is estimated as ~1.2 M_{☉}.

The nebula lies within a large cavity in the surrounding medium. This opening has quadrupolar shape with a physical dimension of 14 pc × 11 pc. The elongation lies along a position angle of 37°±5°, which is aligned with the minor axis of the planetary nebula. This opening was most likely crafted by a fast stellar wind coming from the central star during its asymptotic giant branch stage, prior to the formation of a planetary nebula. The shape and filamentary structures suggest the interaction of a binary star system.

== External links and images ==
- Frommert, Hartmut. "Revised NGC Data for NGC 2899". Students for the Exploration and Development of Space. Archived from the original on 21 December 2012.
- Challis, Pete. "NGC 2899". Harvard-Smithsonian Center for Astrophysics.
- "Stunning Space Butterfly Captured by ESO Telescope". European Southern Observatory. July 30, 2020.
