= RCW 145 =

Emission nebula

Emission nebula
- H II region
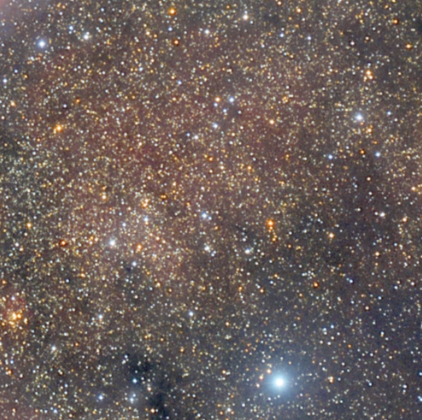
- RCW 145

Observation data: J2000 epoch
- Right ascension: 18^{h} 02^{m} 18^{s}
- Declination: −23° 30′ 56″
- Distance: 8480 ly (2500 pc)
- Apparent magnitude (V): 16.8
- Apparent dimensions (V): 1.59° x 1.17°
- Constellation: Sagittarius

Physical characteristics
- Radius: 47 ly
- Designations: NGC 6526, Sh 2-26, Sh 2-28, Gum 74

RCW 145 is an emission nebula in the constellation Sagittarius. RCW 145 contains both Sh 2-26 and Sh 2-28. It is ionized by the supergiant stars LS 4551 and LS 4538. It is possible it is associated with the Trifid nebula.

== Visibility ==
RCW 145 is often imaged alongside nearby the nebulae of the Lagoon Nebula and Trifid Nebula. The nebula responds well to Hydrogen-alpha filters. It is also easily visible with a Sulfur II filter, however is not very visible in an Oxygen III filter. It is difficult to image with standard RGB.

== Westerhout 28 ==
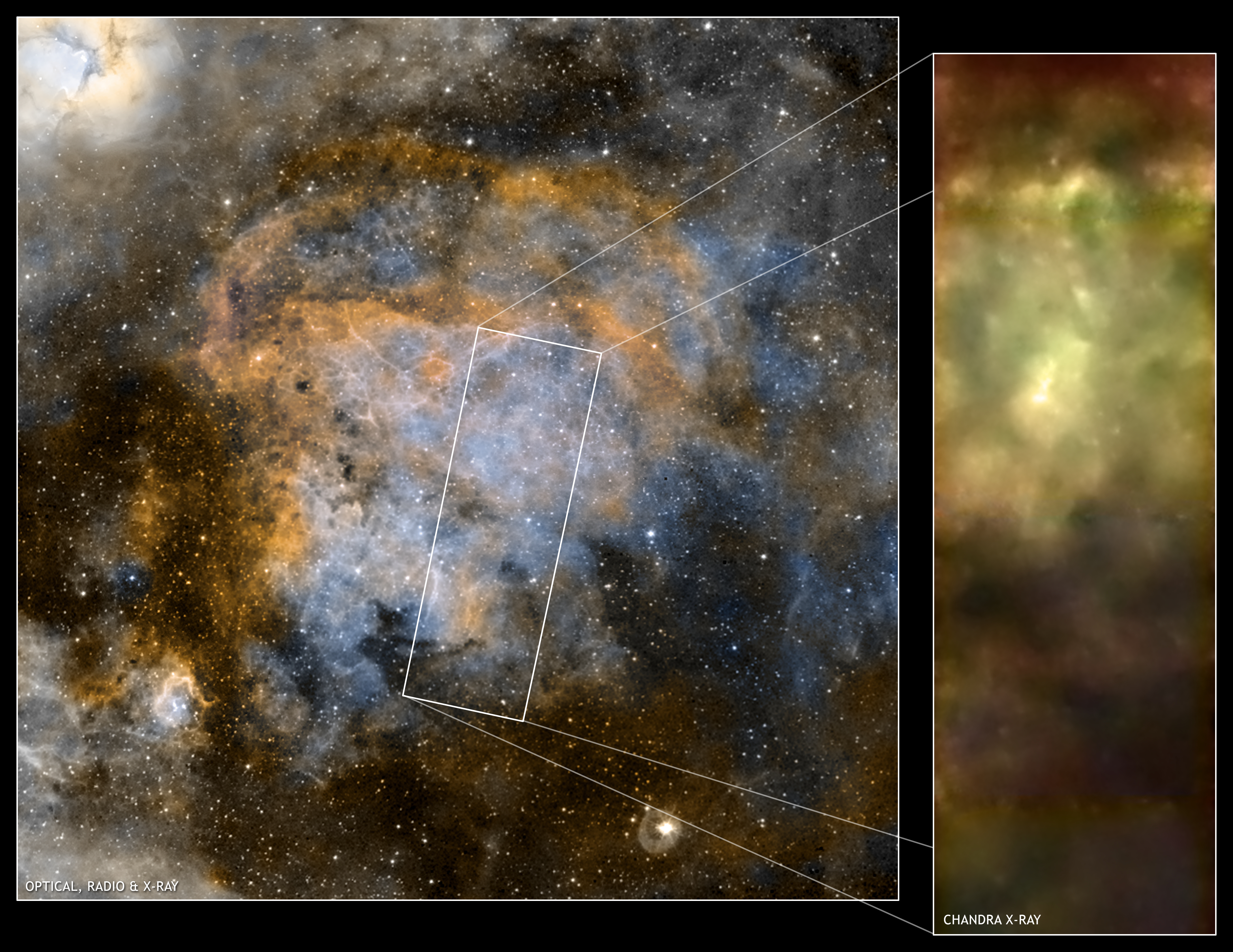
Chandra X-ray Observatory image of Westerhout 28

In the direction of RCW 145 is also the supernova remnant SNR G006.4-00.1 (W28). W28 lies at a further distance of 1800 to 3300 parsecs. It contains multiple pockets of Maser activity. These pockets are 50-100 milliarcseconds in apparent size. W 28 is visible in most wavelengths, from radio waves to gamma rays. There is some ionization caused by W 28. It was initially thought to be cause by x-ray emissions; however, it has since been determined to be cause by cosmic ray emissions.
