= Star-forming regions of Vela =

Star-forming regions in the constellation Vela

Vela star-forming regions
Nebula
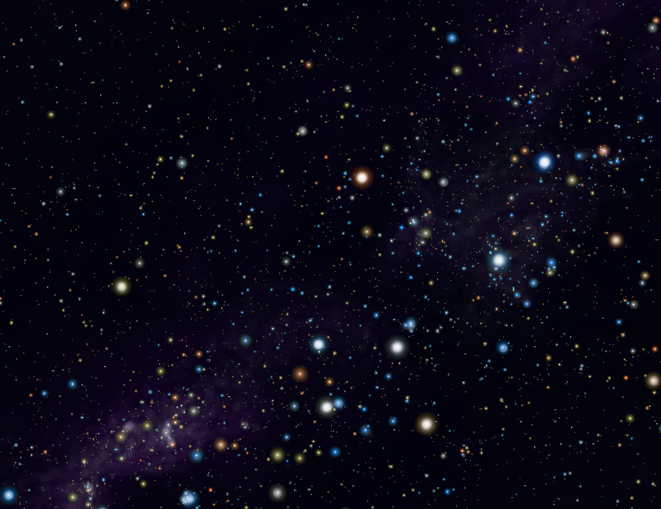
- The constellation Vela

Observation data: J2000.0 epoch
- Right ascension: 09^{h}
- Declination: −45° ′ ″
- Constellation: Vela
- Notable features: Sequence of objects in the direction of Vela

The Vela star-forming regions encompass all the molecular clouds and ionized gas regions visible in the direction of the southern constellation of Vela, where star formation processes are active. The structures visible in this direction do not form a single physically connected complex but consist of often independent systems located at significant distances from each other, which appear aligned along our line of sight in succession.

The star-forming regions closest to the Solar System in this direction are the so-called cometary globules, molecular gas clouds located about 450 parsecs away and associated with the vast Gum Nebula, heavily eroded by the stellar wind of nearby massive stars, where the formation of medium- and low-mass stars occurs.

The most extensive nebular complexes in this direction are part of a superstructure called the Vela Molecular Ridge; this heterogeneous nebular system extends particularly along the northwestern edge of the constellation, where the most prominent H II regions, catalogued as Gum 14 and Gum 17, are located. Massive stars in this region form extensive OB associations, designated as Vela R2 and Puppis R2, situated at distances of approximately 850 and 950 parsecs, respectively.

The most distant nebular systems observable in the direction of Vela are primarily located in the Perseus Arm, one of the major spiral arms of the Milky Way, and in the region corresponding to the so-called New Outer Arm, likely an extension of the Cygnus Arm.

== Observation ==
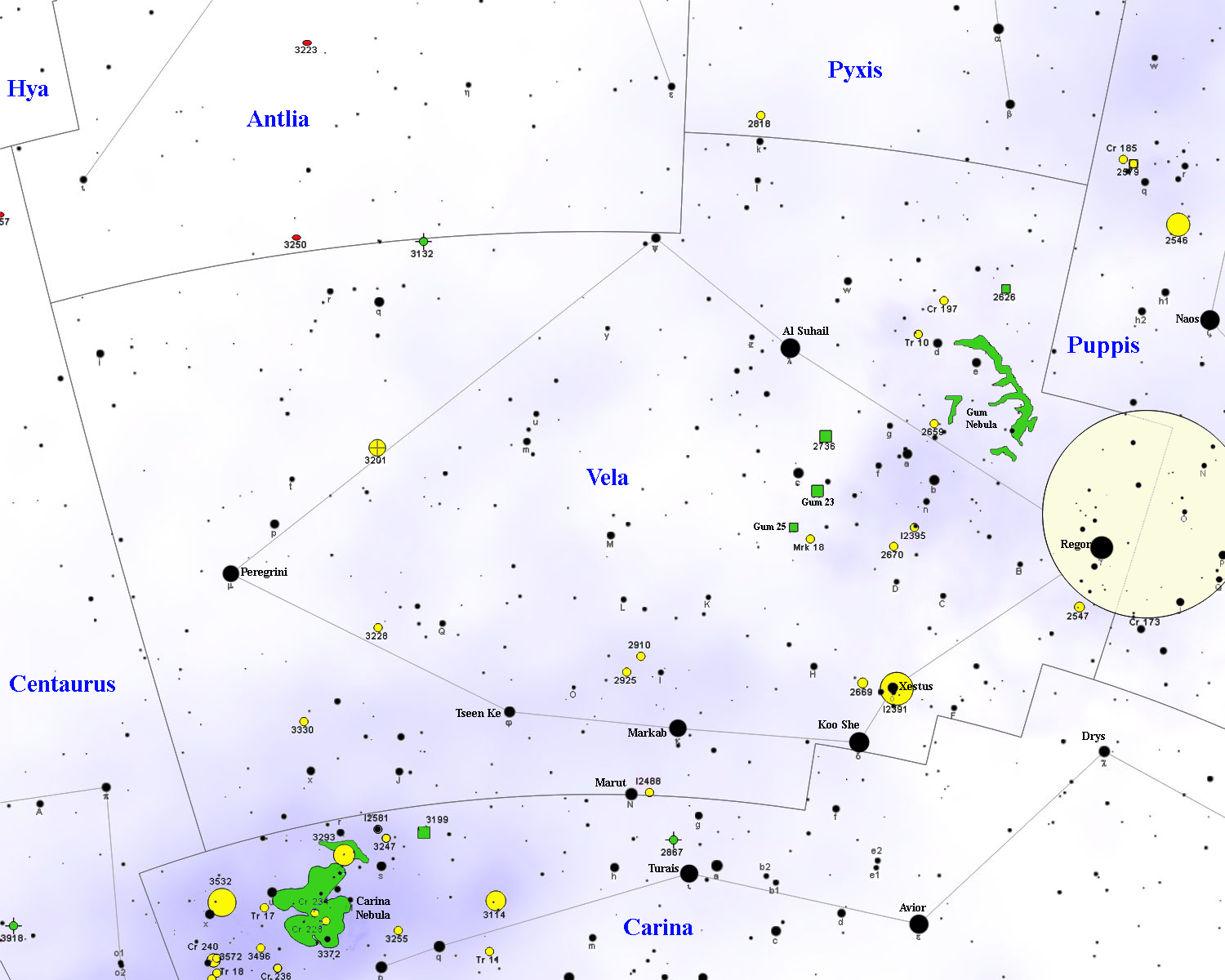
Map of the constellation Vela.

The constellation Vela is located at strongly southern declinations, typically between -40° and -50°; this makes its observation from the Northern Hemisphere quite challenging. From latitudes corresponding to Central Europe, it is practically unobservable, while at the latitude of 40°N, corresponding to the Mediterranean Sea and central United States, visibility is severely limited due to its low elevation above the southern horizon; to observe it fully, one must be at least at a latitude of 34°N. In the northern tropical zone, visibility is good, while it is optimal from the entire Southern Hemisphere.

The nebular components of the constellation are difficult to observe, to the point that direct observation can be quite challenging without appropriate filters; good results are achieved through astronomical photography, which reveals, especially in the western sector of Vela, a faint diffuse nebulosity enveloping the rich background stellar fields: this nebulosity constitutes the eastern part of the Gum Nebula, an ancient supernova remnant located about 450 parsecs from the Sun. Another easily identifiable cloud is NGC 2626, a reflection nebula part of the Vela Molecular Ridge; it can be identified with medium-to-high-power instruments equipped with filters. The stellar components, on the other hand, are partially visible to the naked eye and contribute to forming a rich stellar field, characteristic of the northwestern part of Vela; in particular, the sky area visible between λ Velorum and γ Velorum is occupied by the stellar association Vela OB1, physically linked to the Vela Molecular Ridge. Another easily identifiable association consists of several blue stars located around the bright γ Velorum, known as Vela OB2.

The best period for its observation in the evening sky falls between December and April; from the Southern Hemisphere, the constellation Vela, along with the other components of the Argo Navis constellation, dominates the summer skies, alongside the bright stars Sirius and Canopus.

== Galactic environment ==
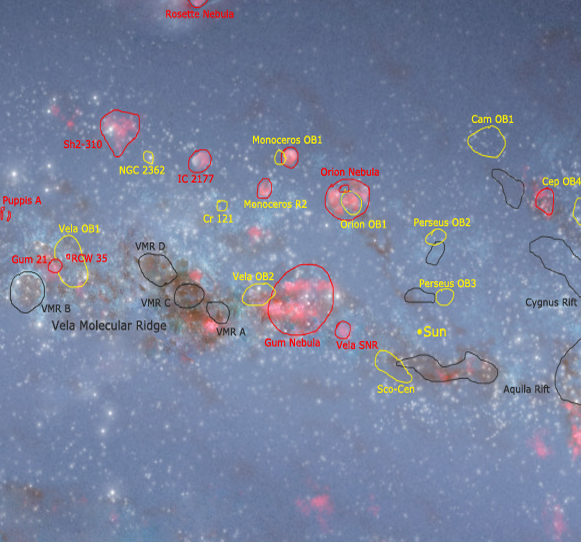
Map of the Orion Arm in the direction of Vela; the Sun is on the right.

The Milky Way in the direction of Vela presents an overlap of objects and structures, all aligned with the galactic plane; such situations can typically hinder the observation of large nebular regions due to the significant interference from strong background radiation. All regions within 2000 parsecs belong to the Orion Arm, specifically its outermost section; in this direction, the Orion Arm is observed along its axis, up to its terminus.

The structure closest to the Sun in this direction is the Vela Supernova Remnant, a supernova remnant formed about 11,400 years ago; it is located approximately 300 parsecs from the Sun and features bright filaments. The object that most dominates this part of the sky, however, is the vast Gum Nebula, which extends for about 30° and also occupies the southern part of the constellation Puppis; it is a large expanding bubble likely generated by the explosion of one or more supernovae, one of which may have originally been a physical companion of the star Naos (ζ Puppis). The cloud’s distance is approximately 450 parsecs, the same as that of the Vela OB2 association.

Beyond this nebula, at a distance between 700 and 1000 parsecs from the Sun, lies the Vela Molecular Ridge, an extensive complex of giant molecular clouds associated with several H II regions; it appears aligned with the Gum Nebula and corresponds to the Vela OB1 association, which occupies the central part of the constellation. Approximately 500 parsecs from the central clouds of the complex is the association Cr 121, visible in the direction of Canis Major; this association is physically linked to Canis Major OB1, an extensive OB association originating from the region hosting the cloud known as the Seagull Nebula.

At about 1800-2000 parsecs from the Sun extend the most remote regions of the Vela Molecular Ridge, which include the clouds designated VMR B and Gum 21; the galactic environment is the same as that hosting the famous supernova remnant Puppis A. Beyond these complexes lies the inter-arm region, particularly the area between the inner Sagittarius-Carina Arm and the outer terminal section of the Perseus Arm. The most distant nebulae observable in this direction predominantly belong to the latter, one of the two major arms of the Milky Way; beyond it lies an even more external arm, likely a continuation of the Cygnus Arm, known as the "New Outer Arm".

== Orion Arm structures ==
The star-forming regions located in the Orion Arm visible in the direction of Vela are within a distance of approximately 2500 parsecs; the outermost regions are situated near the source Puppis A, an ancient supernova remnant visible at the border between Puppis and Vela, and the extensive association Turner 5, a highly dispersed group of blue-white stars located between Vela and Antlia.

=== Gum Nebula ===
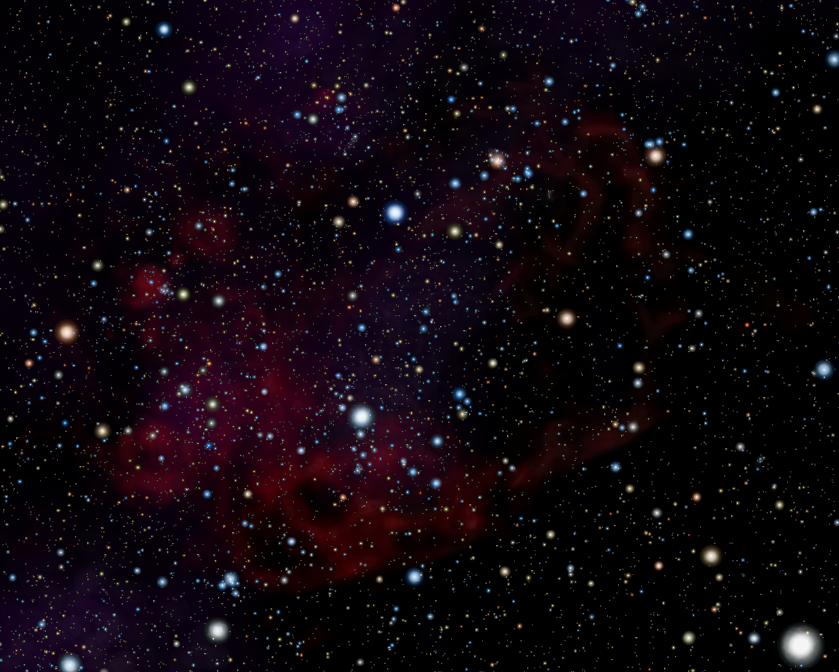
The Gum Nebula. The bright star at the bottom right is Canopus.

The Gum Nebula (also known by the designation Gum 12) is by far the largest known nebula in the entire celestial vault, both in terms of its actual size and its relative proximity. Discovered by Colin Stanley Gum in the early 1950s, its origin has been the subject of much debate: some scientists have hypothesized that it is an ancient Strömgren sphere, i.e., a bubble of ionized hydrogen, while others propose it is a supernova remnant. The most widely accepted theory regarding the nebula’s origin is the latter, suggesting it resulted from the expansion of the cloud following the explosion of one or more supernovae.

The nebula extends over approximately 30° of the celestial vault, between the galactic longitudes l = 245° and l = 275°, covering the western part of the constellation of Vela and the southeastern part of the constellation of Puppis, from the asterism of the False Cross to the star π Puppis. According to some studies, one of the stars that may have given rise to this nebula was a physical companion of Naos (ζ Puppis) which, upon exploding as a supernova, altered the motion of this star, accelerating it and turning it into a runaway star. The expansion of the Gum Nebula occurs unevenly in its different portions: the part facing the Sun expands at a higher speed compared to the opposite side, where it may be hindered by the presence of the Vela Molecular Ridge.

The shock wave caused by the expansion of the Gum Nebula and the intense ultraviolet radiation from the massive stars in the region have eroded and compressed the gases of surrounding clouds, often promoting star formation processes; these phenomena particularly involve the formation of low- and medium-mass stars. Around the nebula, there are several small clouds of neutral gas and dust, composed of a dense core and a long tail; these structures are known as cometary globules and formed due to the erosion of independent molecular clouds by the intense radiation of giant stars in the region, particularly γ Velorum and ζ Puppis. This radiation strips away the outer gaseous layers of the clouds, which disperse in the direction opposite to the radiation sources, forming the tail-like structure. According to other hypotheses, the energy source that stripped the outer layers of the clouds is not the ultraviolet radiation of the two stars but the powerful shock wave caused by the supernova explosions that likely generated the nebula. A total of 36 cometary globules have been identified in this region, most of which are concentrated around the galactic coordinates l = 260°; b = -4°; within them, several Herbig-Haro objects have been observed, providing clear evidence of star formation activity.

=== Vela Molecular Ridge ===
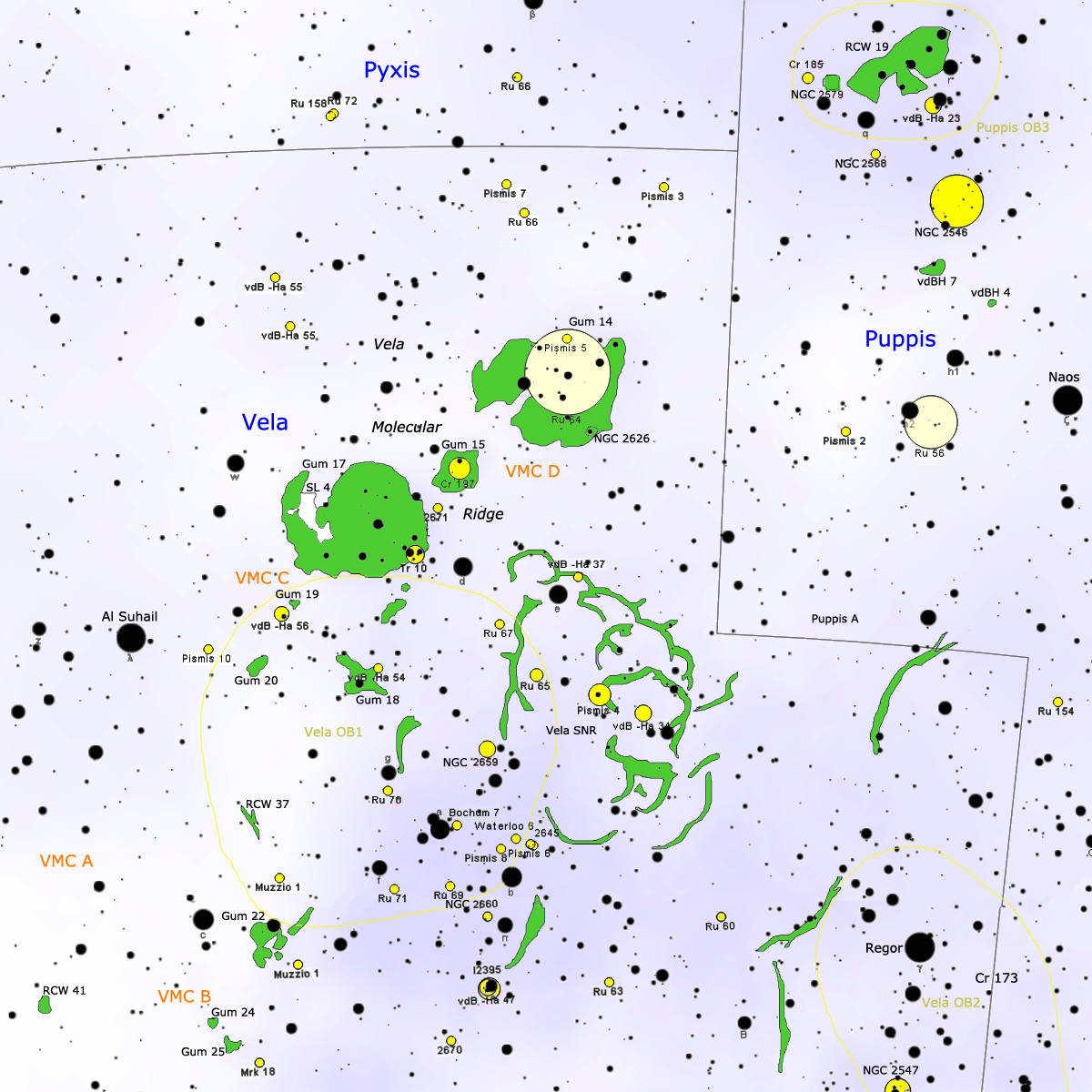
Map of the Vela Molecular Ridge.

The Vela Molecular Ridge (VMR) is a large complex of giant molecular clouds arranged to form a chain in a northwest-southeast direction. The four major clouds are designated with the letters A, B, C, and D, from the easternmost to the westernmost; three of these, A, C, and D, are located at approximately 700-1000 parsecs away and form a single nebular system, while cloud B is situated at a more distant position, around 2000 parsecs.

The two brightest and most observable structures are VMR C and VMR D, visible just north of the faint filaments of the Vela Supernova Remnant; within these clouds, studies of C18O emissions have identified 27 smaller clouds, the most massive of which, located toward VMR C, has a mass of 44,000 M⊙, while the smallest range from 100 to 1000 M⊙. Each of these clouds contains infrared sources corresponding to protostars; of the observed sources, 32 lie within these smaller clouds, while 45 appear scattered outside them, indicating that these sources are more concentrated within the small nebular condensations, where most of the star formation processes in the complex occur.

According to some scientists, the sequence of star formation phenomena in the VMR D cloud originated in a region located in the southwestern part of the complex, where the most massive spectral class O and B components and some scattered molecular clouds are observed; this region is situated in correspondence with the southern part of cloud D and hosted the earliest generative phenomena between 1 and 10 million years ago. Subsequently, these phenomena, due to both the expansion of a bubble caused by the stellar wind of young hot stars, and likely the action of the radiation from these stars, extended to the regions Gum 14 and possibly Gum 17, where several populations of T Tauri stars are observed. These phenomena have finally extended to cloud C and in particular to Gum 20.

The clouds located at 700 parsecs are associated with a bright OB association, known as Vela R2; among the stars belonging to this association, there is a large amount of interstellar gas and dust, partially illuminated by the reflection of the stars' light. Its age is estimated to be between a few hundred thousand and a few million years. Cloud B, on the other hand, is likely associated with the large Vela OB1 association, which includes several dozen massive stars, including two yellow supergiants. Most of these stars, however, appear obscured by the interstellar dust along the line of sight. In addition to the OB associations, there are the so-called T associations, i.e., populous groups of T Tauri stars; these groups are particularly found in the clouds Gum 14 and Gum 17 and provide clear evidence of recent star formation phenomena.

== Other regions ==
Among the most prominent H II regions in Vela is Gum 15 (RCW 32); it is a nebula extending approximately 30 arcminutes located about 1000 parsecs away in the direction of VMR C, with which it is likely associated, and is dominated by young blue stars belonging to the open cluster Cr 197. Other studies place it at just 424 parsecs. The primary source of electric arc in the nebula is likely the star HD 74804, a B-class star sometimes identified as a main sequence star and sometimes as a bright giant. The central part of this nebula is obscured by a band of dark dust, cataloged as SL 2, with a radial velocity of +22.4 km s−1, comparable to that of the stars in Cr 197. In the direction of the complex, 21 stars with Hα emissions are known, 15 of which are actually T Tauri stars and two are Herbig Ae/Be stars. Additionally, there are about 70 other stars exhibiting T Tauri characteristics, plus around 30 X-ray sources, also associated with this type of young stellar object. According to some researchers, this cloud is closely related to the nearby Gum 14 (RCW 27) and together they form a single star-forming region, designated as SFR 265.00-2.00.

At a similar or slightly closer distance (700-800 parsecs), there is a dark nebula known as DC268.1+1.8; it is observed in the direction of cloud VMR A, on the edge of VMR C, and stands out prominently due to the presence of a rich background stellar field. The cloud consists of two main parts oriented east-west and connected by thin nebular filaments; part of the gas in the western cloud (Sa 114) is illuminated by three blue stars belonging to the Vela R2 association, forming the reflection nebula vdBH 29. The western cloud of DC268.1+1.8 also hosts a Herbig-Haro object known as HH 75; the energy source for this object has not been precisely identified: according to some studies, it could be the infrared source IRAS 09094−4522, which appears to coincide with the star vdBH 29b and is well-aligned with the jet of HH 75; however, other studies suggest that this source, also designated as LLN92 47, is located about 200 parsecs closer to the Sun, making it a foreground object. The nebula also contains a second object, HH 133, located near another infrared source, IRAS 09092−4516.

At a distance of approximately 2900-3100 parsecs lies Gum 19 (RCW 34), a small H II region likely located outside the Orion Arm, in an inter-arm region; its ionization is driven by vdBH 25a, a blue main-sequence star observed in the direction of the reflection nebula vdBH 25, which, being about 700 parsecs from the Sun, is not physically associated with Gum 19. Within the nebula, two masers have been identified, one of water and one of methanol, both typical of ultracompact H II regions hosting forming stellar objects. On the northern edge of the nebula, north of the ionization front of the star vdBH 25a, lies the bright infrared source IRAS 08546−4254, coinciding with a young massive star, around which star formation processes are likely active, particularly at the edge of the ionization front; near this source, a small infrared cluster, DBS2003 28, has also been discovered.

== Structures beyond the Orion Arm ==
Beyond 2500-3000 parsecs lies the inter-arm region between the two major arms of Sagittarius-Carina and Perseus Arm; due to the curvature of the spiral arms, objects beyond this zone fall within the terminal section of the Perseus Arm, which in this region is partially heavily obscured by galactic dust. The most notable nebula in this inter-arm region is Gum 24 (RCW 39); it is a little-studied nebula located at about 3000 parsecs, very similar to RCW 34, visible a few degrees to the northwest. However, some studies suggest it is physically connected to the VMR B cloud, at only 1700 parsecs. The ionization front originates from the star HD 78344, a blue supergiant of magnitude 9.09. The nebula is a strong source of infrared radiation and is likely associated with two molecular clouds with CO emissions. The cloud likely hosts star formation processes, as evidenced by the presence of a water maser, located southeast of the nebula's central region, which appears to be associated with IRAS 09017−4814, one of the seven known infrared radiation sources in the cloud.

In the direction of the Vela Molecular Ridge, in the northwestern part of the constellation, lies a large expanding superbubble known as GS263-02+45, extending over 600 parsecs; this structure is located in the Perseus Arm at a distance of about 5300 parsecs and appears to be associated with the very young open cluster Bochum 7. The neutral hydrogen mass contained in the superbubble is approximately 1.5 million solar masses and was likely caused either by a supernova explosion or by the action of the stellar wind from the young stars within it; if the expansion is attributed to these stars, its dynamic age would be between 13 and 30 million years. The Bochum 7 cluster is at a comparable or slightly closer distance, suggesting, along with measurements of the proper motion of its stellar components, that it is related to the superbubble; its formation may be linked to the interaction between the superbubble and surrounding neutral clouds: the expansion of GS263-02+45 may have compressed these clouds, thus promoting star formation processes. Bochum 7 is effectively an OB association, being predominantly composed of hot, massive stars of spectral classes O and B; the presence of a nearby infrared source (IRAS 08426-4601) suggests that sequential star formation processes are active in the region.

Beyond the Perseus Arm, or at the outer edge of the Sagittarius-Carina Arm, in an ultra-peripheral region of the Milky Way, lies the large nebula Gum 26 (RCW 42); it is a massive H II region, one of the largest known, with an estimated distance of 6400 parsecs. According to some studies, this nebula is associated with a giant galactic "chimney," designated as GSH 277+00+36; this structure, with a diameter of about 600 parsecs, crosses the entire galactic plane, with a length of approximately 1000 parsecs. It contains a large amount of neutral hydrogen, while the column-like structure forming the chimney's body appears hollow inside. The origin of the structure is not well understood, as no dissipating stellar objects or galactic clusters have been identified at its distance; among the various possibilities is the potential impact of a high-velocity cloud with the galactic plane.

== OB associations ==
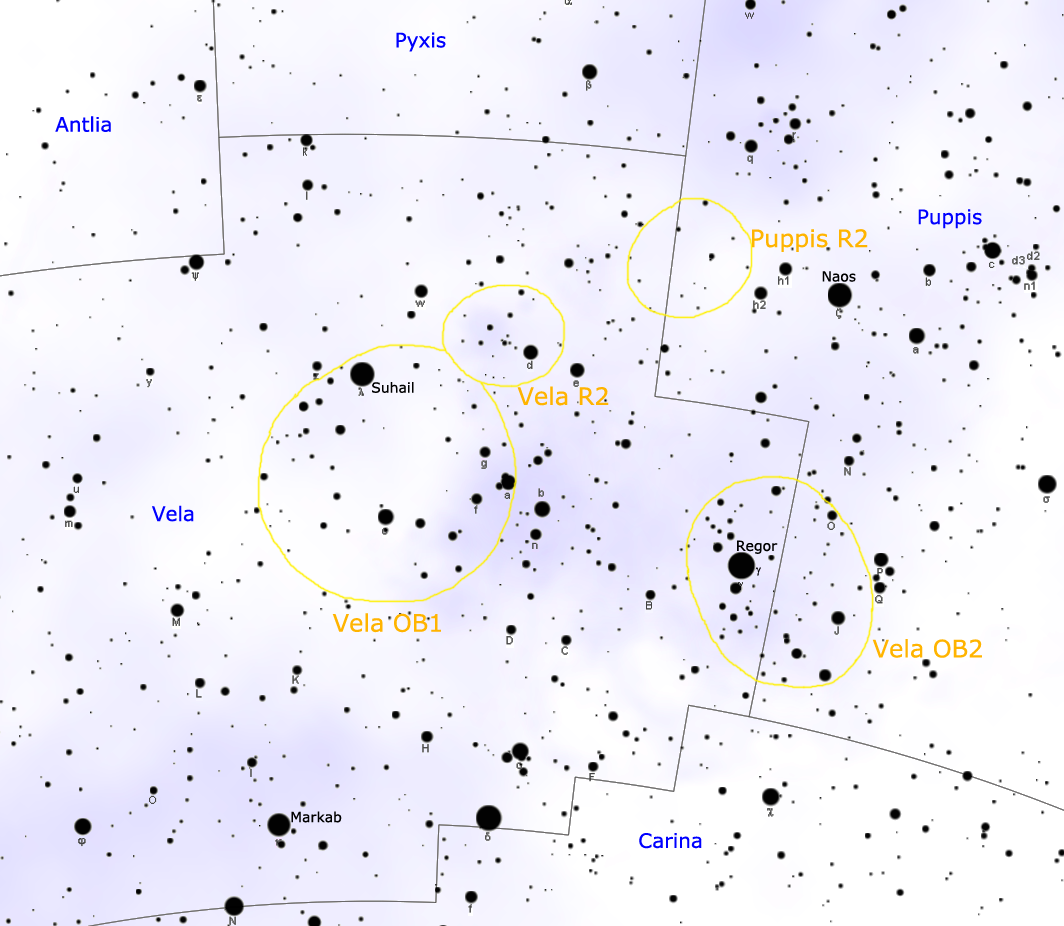
Map of the constellation Vela highlighting the four OB associations belonging to the Orion Arm.

An OB association is a recently formed stellar association containing dozens of massive stars of spectral class O and B, i.e., blue and very hot; they form together in giant molecular clouds, whose residual gas, once the stars are formed, is swept away by the strong stellar wind. Within a few million years, most of the brightest stars in the association explode as supernovae, while smaller stars survive much longer due to their lower mass. It is believed that most stars in our Galaxy originally belonged to OB associations. Paradoxically, OB associations in other galaxies can be studied more easily than those in our own due to the presence of dark clouds that obscure most objects within the Milky Way.

The major OB associations visible in the direction of Vela all belong to the Orion Arm. The closest is located about 420 parsecs away and is known as Vela OB2, linked to the Gum Nebula; in correspondence with clouds C and D of the Vela Molecular Ridge, at about 850 parsecs, are the two R associations, Puppis R2 and Vela R2, whose stellar components are enveloped in faint nebular banks. Vela OB1 is the most extensive, though also the most distant, located over 1500 parsecs away.

=== Vela OB1 ===
Vela OB1 is an extensive OB association identified in 1978 and likely linked to the more distant regions of the Vela Molecular Ridge; it occupies the northwestern part of Vela and contains 15 giant stars of classes O and B easily identifiable, plus two yellow supergiants of class F and other lower-mass stars. Its extent is about 6° x 4°, which at an average distance of 1690 parsecs corresponds to approximately 180 x 120 parsecs. Estimates of its distance vary depending on interpretations: all researchers agree that the association consists of multiple stellar aggregates, which some place at 1200, 1700, and 2300 parsecs, near the VMR B cloud, while others estimate distances of 700, 1410, and 1430 parsecs, closer to the VMR A and VMR C clouds. The various subgroups are designated with the letters A, B, and C, ordered from west to east and from closest to farthest. In addition to the 15 stars identified in 1978, there are 55 equally bright stars, heavily obscured by interstellar dust; among the association’s components may also be the well-known X-ray source Vela X-1, a binary pulsar.

The association is likely linked to the nebulae Gum 18 and Gum 22, given their compatible distances, while the brightest components are the blue giants HD 75211, of class O and magnitude 7.55, and CD-47 4551 (LS 1216), a star with strong emission lines of magnitude 8.45.

=== Vela OB2 ===
Vela OB2 is the closest OB association to the Sun visible in the direction of Vela, as well as one of the closest overall, after the Scorpius-Centaurus association; located at an average distance of about 410-420 parsecs, it is physically situated within the Gum Nebula. Vela OB2 is easily identifiable even with binoculars due to the brightness of its components and can be seen with the naked eye under good observing conditions. The association includes nearly a hundred components spread over a diameter of about 6°, the brightest of which are γ Velorum, located apparently at its geometric center, plus other stars of fourth and fifth magnitude, such as HD 68324, HD 64740, and HD 65818. Using data from the satellite Hipparcos, it was determined that Vela OB2 effectively coincides with the extensive open cluster cataloged in the 1930s by Per Collinder as Cr 173, although he assigned it a different distance. Estimates of the association’s distance are somewhat controversial, ranging from 380 to 500 parsecs, as is the presence of the Vela Pulsar within the association.

Some scientists have questioned the actual membership of γ Velorum in the association, as its age appears to differ from that of the association’s stars: Vela OB2 is estimated to be about 10-20 million years old, while γ Velorum is younger, at about 3-4 million years. These scientists have hypothesized that the intense ultraviolet radiation from this Wolf-Rayet star may have swept away residual gas, effectively halting star formation. γ Velorum is also located at the center of a distinct subgroup within the association; this separation is likely due to star formation processes occurring in multiple distinct locations within the original giant molecular cloud, possibly in a temporal sequence.

=== Vela R2 ===
Vela R2 is a bright association comprising B-class stars embedded in diffuse nebulae; it was identified in 1975 and extends in the direction of the VMR C cloud over a few square degrees. It includes nine supermassive stars of spectral class B with magnitudes ranging from eighth to fourteenth, with an average age of about one million years. The "R" designation indicates that the association is linked to reflection nebulae, including vdBH 25b, vdBH 27, and vdBH 28; the latter is associated with a group of eight stars with weak Hα emissions, while another group of eight similar stars is linked to the cloud vdBH 27. These stars have significantly lower masses than the B-class giants and likely belong to the same generation as the more massive components of Vela R2. On the southwestern edge of the association, there is another group of 16 Hα stars connected to two HH objects, confirming the young age of the association. The distance of Vela R2 is estimated at about 850 parsecs, in the same galactic region as the VMR C and VMR D clouds. In the same direction, another star, vdBH 25a, is observed; however, it is not part of the association but is physically connected to the cloud Gum 19 (RCW 34), located over 3000 parsecs away.

=== Puppis R2 ===
The Puppis R2 association is located at the border between the constellations of Puppis and Vela; it comprises about ten B- and A-class stars on the main sequence, enveloped in nebulosity; the association is about 950 parsecs away and is physically connected to the western part of the Vela Molecular Ridge, particularly cloud D. The association consists of two subgroups: the westernmost lies entirely within Puppis and includes the nebular stars vdBH 3, vdBH 4, and vdBH 7; the second subgroup extends into Vela and includes NGC 2626, vdBH 18, and vdBH 20. The latter subgroup is directly aligned with the VMR D cloud and the H II region Gum 14 (RCW 27); the westernmost subgroup extends north of ζ Puppis and south of the Puppis R3 association, which, at about 1600 parsecs, is not physically connected to the Vela Molecular Ridge but forms a separate group likely linked to Puppis OB3.

== See also ==
- Molecular cloud
- H II region
- Vela Molecular Ridge
- Gum Nebula
- Vela Supernova Remnant

== Bibliography ==
=== General texts ===
- Robert Burnham, Jr (1978). Burnham's Celestial Handbook: Volume Two. New York: Dover Publications, Inc.
- Thomas T. Arny (2007). Explorations: An Introduction to Astronomy (3 updated ed.). Boston: McGraw-Hill. ISBN 978-0-07-321369-9.
- AA.VV (2002). L'Universo - Grande enciclopedia dell'astronomia [The Universe - Great Encyclopedia of Astronomy] (in Italian). Novara: De Agostini.
- Gribbin, J. (2005). Enciclopedia di astronomia e cosmologia [Encyclopedia of Astronomy and Cosmology] (in Italian). Milano: Garzanti. ISBN 88-11-50517-8.
- Owen, W. (2006). Atlante illustrato dell'Universo [Illustrated Atlas of the Universe] (in Italian). Milano: Il Viaggiatore. ISBN 88-365-3679-4.

=== Specific texts ===
==== On stellar evolution ====
- Lada, C. J.; N. D. Kylafits (1999). The Origin of Stars and Planetary Systems. Kluwer Academic Publishers. ISBN 0-7923-5909-7.
- De Blasi, A. (2002). Le stelle: nascita, evoluzione e morte [The Stars: Birth, Evolution, and Death] (in Italian). Bologna: CLUEB. ISBN 88-491-1832-5.
- Abbondi, C. (2007). Universo in evoluzione dalla nascita alla morte delle stelle [The Evolving Universe from the Birth to the Death of Stars] (in Italian). Sandit. ISBN 978-88-89150-32-0.

==== On the star-forming regions of Vela ====
- Pettersson, B. (2008). "Young Stars and Dust Clouds in Puppis and Vela". Handbook of Star Forming Regions, Volume II: The Southern Sky ASP Monograph Publications. Vol. 5. Astronomical Society of the Pacific. p. 43. Bibcode:2008hsf2.book...43P. ISBN 978-1-58381-670-7. (PDF version)

=== Celestial charts ===
- Toshimi Taki (2005). "Taki's 8.5 Magnitude Star Atlas". Archived from the original on November 5, 2018. - Freely downloadable celestial atlas in PDF format.
- Tirion, Rappaport, Lovi (1987). Uranometria 2000.0 - Volume II - The Southern Hemisphere to +6°. Richmond, Virginia, USA: Willmann-Bell, inc. ISBN 0-943396-15-8.
- Tirion, Sinnott (1998). Sky Atlas 2000.0 (2 ed.). Cambridge, USA: Cambridge University Press. ISBN 0-933346-90-5.
- Tirion (2001). The Cambridge Star Atlas 2000.0 (3 ed.). Cambridge, USA: Cambridge University Press. ISBN 0-521-80084-6.
