= Vela Molecular Ridge =

Molecular cloud complex in the constellations Vela and Puppis

Nebula

Observation data: J2000 epoch
- Right ascension: 08^{h} 53^{m}
- Declination: −45° 00′
- Distance: 2300-6500 ly ly (700-2000 pc pc)
- Apparent dimensions (V): 8°

Vela Molecular Ridge is a molecular cloud complex in the constellations Vela and Puppis. Radio ^{12}CO observations of the region showed the ridge to be composed of several clouds, each with masses 100,000–1,000,000 M_{☉}. This cloud complex lies on the sky in the direction of the Gum Nebula (foreground) and the Carina–Sagittarius Spiral Arm (background). The most important clouds in the region are identified by the letters A, B, C and D, and in fact belong to two different complexes: the clouds A, C and D are located at an average distance of about 700-1000 parsecs (2300-3300 light years) and are related to the OB association Vela R2, while cloud B is located at a greater distance, up to 2000 parsecs (6500 light years) away, and is physically connected to the extended Vela OB1 association.

Part of the gas in the clouds is ionized by the ultraviolet radiation of some of the most massive stars associated with the complex, constituting H II regions of great extent, as Gum 14 (RCW 27) and Gum 20 (RCW 36). Stellar formation activity is confirmed by the discovery of several associations of T Tauri stars, particularly in the VMR D cloud, as well as by the presence of several open clusters heavily obscured and deeply immersed in the gas observable at infrared wavelengths.

The brightest and warmest stars of the Vela R2 association illuminate some filaments of gas that shine with a bluish light, typical of reflection nebulae. Among these is the well-known NGC 2626 nebulae which belongs to the VMR D cloud and hosts some stars presenting Hα emission and the famous Herbig-Haro object HH 132.

== Observation ==
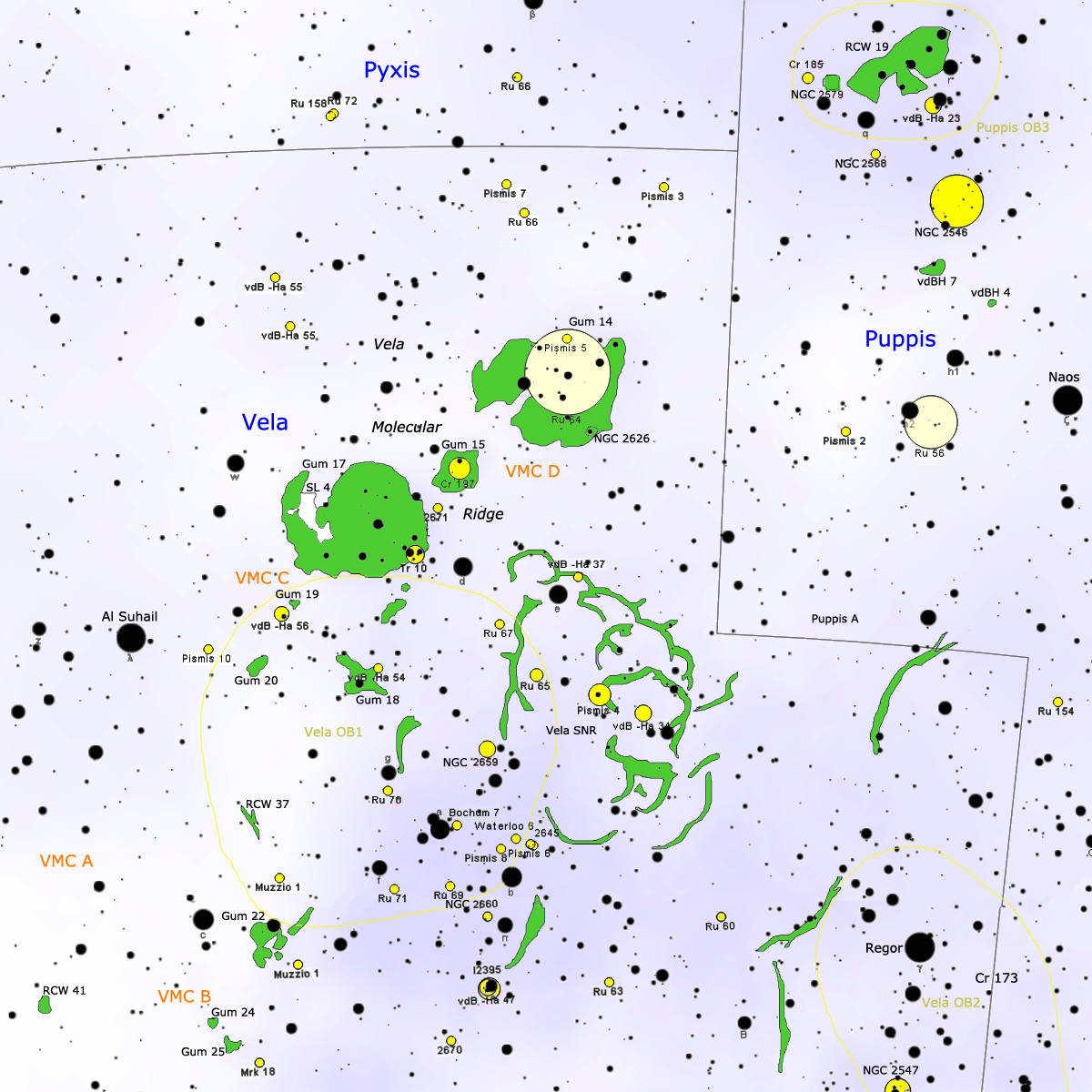
Map of the Vela Molecular Ridge.

The Vela Molecular Ridge appears as a sequence of bright and dark nebulae, located on the northwestern side of Vela. The main sequence of nebulae that compose it is located a few degrees northwest of the star Lambda Velorum, while some dark ramifications also extend south of it, reaching the central areas of the constellation. The nebulae components of the system are not observable to the naked eye nor with amateur instruments, since they tend to be very weak. The only cloud easily identifiable is NGC 2626, a reflection nebula located in the westernmost region of the complex; it can be detected with medium-high powered instruments equipped with filters. The stellar components, however, are partially visible to the naked eye and combine to form a rich star field, characteristic of the northwestern part of Vela; in particular, the area of the sky visible between Lambda Velorum and Gamma Velorum is occupied by the Vela OB1 stellar association, physically linked to the Vela Molecular Ridge.

This complex is located at a southern declination, between -40° and -50°; this means that the observation of the region from the Northern Hemisphere is very difficult. From latitudes corresponding to central Europe is never actually seen, while at latitude 40°N, that which runs through the Mediterranean Sea and the central part of the United States of America, the visibility is made difficult by to the low elevation above the southern horizon. In the tropical Northern Hemisphere, on the other hand, the visibility is good, while it is optimal from all over the Southern Hemisphere.

The best time to observe the complex lies between the months of December and April; from the southern hemisphere the constellations of Vela, Carina, and Puppis dominate the summer skies, along with the bright stars Sirius and Canopus.

== Galactic environment ==
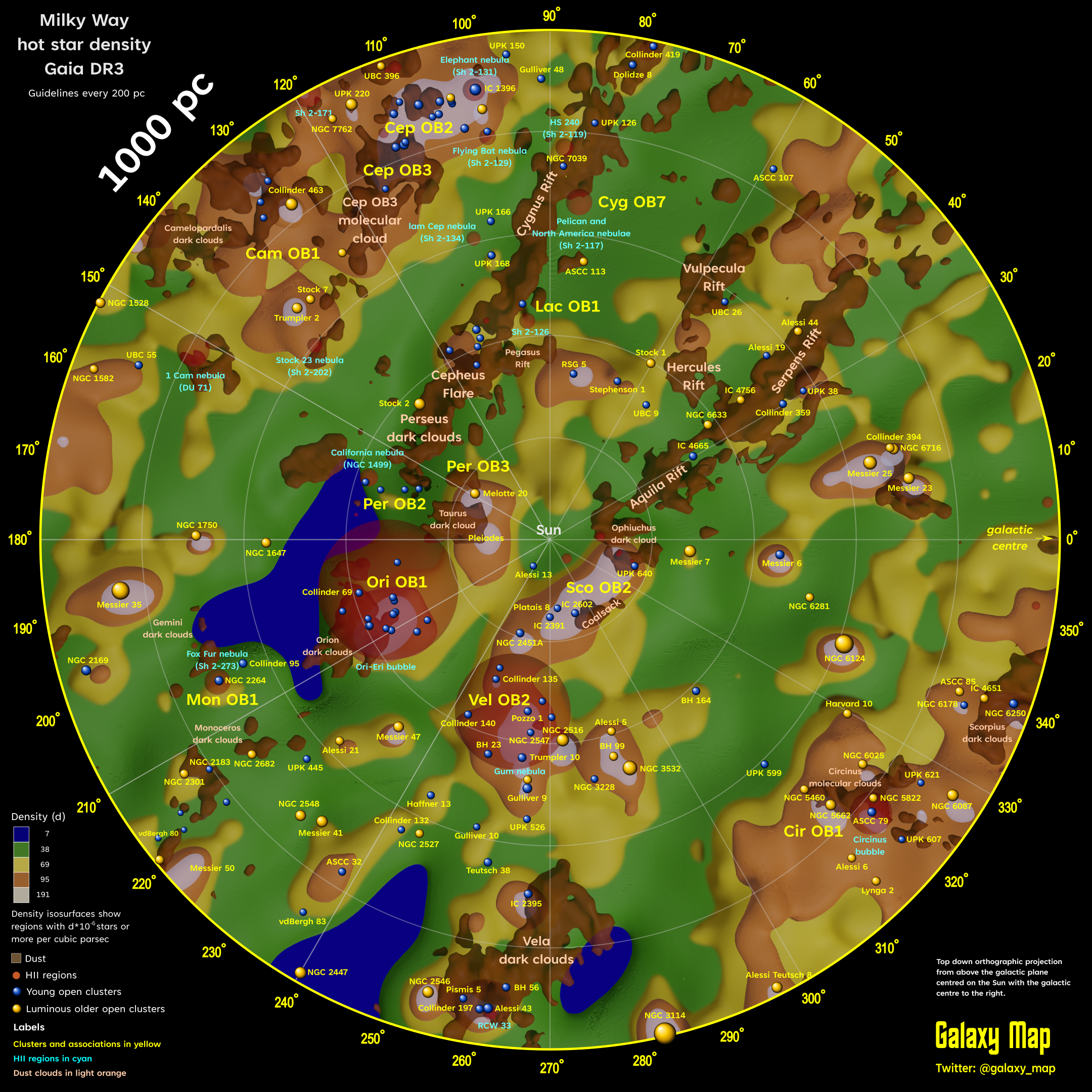
Map of the star local neighborhood within 1000 parsecs; the Sun is at the center. The Vela dark clouds is at 270° galactic longitude, bottom-center.

The Milky Way in the direction of the Vela Molecular Ridge presents an overlap of objects and structures, all roughly aligned with the galactic plane; situations of this kind may tend to hinder the observation of large nebulae regions, due to the disturbance by the strong background radiation. The dominant object in this direction is the large Gum Nebula, which extends for about 30° occupying the southern part of the Puppis constellation; this is a big bubble in expansion probably generated by the explosion of one or more supernova, one of which may have been originally a physical companion of the star Naos (also called Zeta Puppis). The distance from the Sun to this cloud is about 450 parsecs. Superimposed on this and the clouds of the Vela Molecular Ridge it can be observed the faint strands of the famous Vela Supernova Remnant (also referred to as Gum 16), a supernova remnant located about 300 parsecs from the Sun and placed in the foreground with respect to the Gum Nebula itself.

The Vela Molecular Ridge complex is located beyond this nebula, at a distance between 700 and 1000 parsecs from the Sun; it is on the inside edge of the Orion Arm, aligned with the Gum Nebula. At about 500 parsecs away from the central clouds of the complex is the association Cr 121, visible in the direction of Canis Major. This association is physically linked to Canis Major OB1, an extended OB association originating from the region that hosts the cloud known as Seagull Nebula. Cr 121 is linked to a giant expanding superbubble, called GSH 238+00+09, probably generated by the explosion of at least thirty supernova located right inside of this association; the powerful shockwave generated would affect some of the surrounding regions located within a radius of 500 parsecs from it, such as the Gum Nebula, the giant molecular cloud Monoceros R2 and the Orion complex.

The outermost regions of the Vela Molecular Ridge is located at approximately 1800-2000 parsecs from the Sun, wherein are included the clouds called VMR B and Gum 21; the galactic environment is the same in which the supernova remnant Puppis A is located. At 1500 parsecs from the Sun at the outer edge of the Orion Arm, the large region Sh2-310 can be found in which it was formed the massive open cluster NGC 2362.

== Structure ==
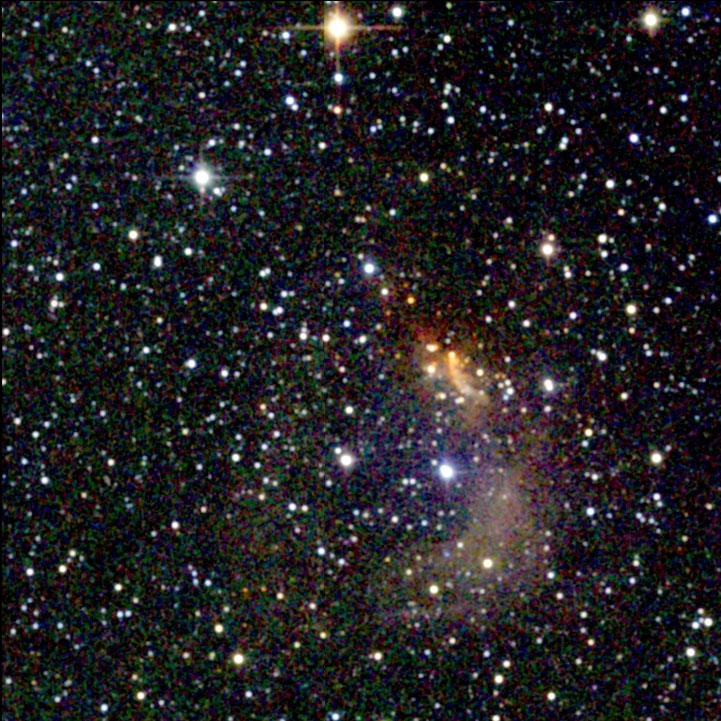
NGC 2626, one of the brightest nebulae of the complex.

The Vela Molecular Ridge is a nebulous complex composed of several giant molecular clouds, arranged to form a kind of concatenation oriented northwest-southeast. The name of the complex was assigned in a 1991 study which analyzed CO emissions; this structure appears to be divided into four main regions (clouds), identified by the letters A, B, C and D. These clouds, with the exception of B, have a mass of approximately 300.000 M_{☉} and are located at a distance of around 700-1000 parsec. The B cloud has a mass of about one million M_{☉} and, despite being apparently part of the concatenation, is located at a much greater distance, around 2000 parsecs, and is probably part of a different complex and independent from the other three clouds.

The two brightest and more easily observable structures are VMR C and VMR D, the westernmost of the Vela Molecular Ridge, visible just north of the tenuous filament of the Vela Supernova Remnant. Within these giant molecular clouds 27 minor clouds have been identified through studies of C^{18}O emissions, the most massive of which, in the direction of VMR C, has a mass equal to 44.000 M_{☉} and the smaller ranging from 100 to 1000 M_{☉}. Each one of these clouds harbor at their core some infrared sources, that are all coincident with protostars. Of the observed sources 32 lie within these minor clouds while 45 appear dispersed outside them, indicating that these sources are more concentrated within small nebulous clumps, where most of the complex's star formation process takes place.

The four major clouds of the Vela Molecular Ridge are associated with about twenty young open clusters, of which at least 14 are part of the complex placed at 700 parsecs (A, C and D): among them stands the well-known NGC 2547 cluster, consisting of about 700 stars some of which are very young, and Cr 197 which is visible in the direction of the VMR D cloud and consists of 25 very young stars. The brightest nebulous component of the A-C-D complex is cataloged as Gum 14 (RCW 27), inside of which is included NGC 2626 itself and Gum 15 (RCW 32); the first, linked in particular to the VMR D cloud, appears ionized by the blue giant HD 73882 star which is part of the young association known as Ru 64, in addition to HD 73285 and HD 73500, both of spectral class B and physically related to the association. Gum 15 on the other hand is ionized by the components of the Cr 197 cluster and in particular by the blue star HD 74804. Together they form the star-forming region indicated by the abbreviation SFR 265.00-2.00. Other studies suggest, however, for Gum 15 a distance of just 424 parsecs.

The cloud VMR B, located at about 2000 parsecs in the peripheries of Orion's Arm, is related to the Vela OB1 association and the HII regions Gum 21 and Gum 18 (RCW 35). Gum 21 is probably part of an extensive ring-shaped nebula surrounding the Wolf-Rayet star WR 14, while 18 Gum, ionized by the blue Star CD-43 4690, is located in the middle of the Vela OB1 association.

According to some scientists, the sequence of star formation phenomena in the VMR D cloud originated in a localized region in the southwestern part of the complex, in which we observe the most massive components and the earliest spectral classes (O and B) and some dispersed molecular clouds. This region is located in correspondence with the southern part of the D cloud and has hosted the first generative phenomena from 10 million to 1 million years ago. Subsequently, the phenomena, both due to the expansion of a bubble caused by the stellar wind of hot young stars, and probably due to the action of the radiation of these same stars, extended to the regions Gum 14 and possibly Gum 17, where we can observe different populations of T Tauri stars. Such phenomena finally extended to the C cloud and in particular to Gum 20 and the Vela R2 association, whose age is estimated to be between a few hundred thousand years and a few million years.

== Star formation phenomena ==
The clouds in the Vela Molecular Ridge are the locations where an intense star formation process takes place as evidenced by the presence of numberus IRAS sources, whose spectral characteristics are similar to that of young stellar objects, as well as by the presence of some young clusters still deeply wrapped by gas; the highest concentration of these sources is located in the C cloud. It is believed that these infrared sources, especially distributed within the densest small molecular clouds in the four major complexes, are particularly associated with Class I protostars, mostly T Tauri stars.

=== Vela Molecular Ridge A ===
The A cloud of the Vela Molecular Ridge occupies the most southeastern position of the system, south of λ Velorum. Of the infrared sources coincident with stars of Class I, only 5 are located within this cloud, which thus appears as the least active from the point of view of star formation. The most conspicuous bright cloud belonging to VMR A is listed as RCW 41 which has an irregular appearance and contains within it the young cluster [DBS2003] 36, composed of 62 massive stars of spectral type B visible in the infrared. The main source linked to the cluster is IRAS 09149-4743, also identified as a source of radio and sometimes referred to as being associated with a CO maser: it is a very hot star of spectral class B, which is also one of the main responsible for the ionization of the gas in the cloud. This object is located in the central part of the cluster. To this is added a second star, located in a sub-cluster which belongs to the former.

Within the cloud there is also an ultracompact HII region of diameter of 6,5' inside of which a water and a methanol maser are located. The latter in particular is an important indicator of the presence of massive stars formation phenomena, being an object characteristic of ultra-compact ionized gas clouds in which this kind of phenomena takes place.

RCW 41 is the main body of the star formation region cataloged as SFR 270.26+0.80 and indicated in the 2002 Avedisova catalogue with the initials Avedisova 2224.

=== Vela Molecular Ridge B ===
The B cloud of the Vela Molecular Ridge is a structure independent of the others, located at about 2000 parsecs in a remote and peripheral region of the Orion Arm. In it are contained 7 of the infrared sources associated with objects of Class I, none of which has been studied in detail. The main bright clouds that are part of this cloud are catalogued as Gum 24 and Gum 25 (RCW 39 and RCW 40).

Gum 24 is a poorly researched nebula whose distance has been estimated at about 1700 parsecs, i.e. in correspondence with the association Vela OB1, but this is uncertain to the point that other estimates place it up to 3000 parsecs away, i.e. in an intermediate zone between the most remote part of the Perseus Arm and that of Carina-Sagittarius, beyond the end of the Orion Arm. The main responsible for the ionization of its gas would be the blue supergiant HD 78344, although there is no certainty on the matter. Among the evidence of star formation in this cloud it's the presence of a water maser located to the southeast of the central zone of the nebula, which appears to be associated with IRAS 09017-4814, one of the 7 known infrared radiation sources in the cloud, probably a young bright star heavily obscured by the dust that surrounds it.

The distance to Gum 25 (also cataloged as BBW224) seems to be more certain, since different scholars agree to position it about 1800 parsecs, at the same distance to VMR B. The main source of ionization of its gas is a main sequence blue star of class O9V listed as CD-48 4352, part of the Vela OB1 association. Around the cloud is a large ring-like structure of dust where some denser and brighter clusters exist, in which there is an ongoing process of gravitational collapse which will lead to the generation of new stars. The cloud is also home to a young cluster deeply immersed in the gas, cataloged with the number 251 in a catalog published in 2003 by Bica et al.

=== Vela Molecular Ridge C ===
The C cloud of the Vela Molecular Ridge is observed north of the easternmost part of the Gum Nebula, about 1000 parsecs away in the direction of the Gum 17 (RCW 33) nebula, which, however, might not be connected to the region of the Vela Molecular Ridge. The evolutionary phase of this structure is slightly younger than that of the nearby VMR D and shows signs of a recent star formation activity; inside which have been discovered some infrared sources deeply nested in dense molecular clouds showing C^{18}O emission. Three of them coincide with the same number of Class I young stellar objects of intermediate mass, ranging between 2 and 10 M_{☉}; in addition to 28 probable protostars of medium-small mass and five very compact young clusters immersed in dense nebulosity. These clusters possess respectively a number between 10 and 350 young stars, in all cases enclosed within a diameter of just a parsec or even less. The Vela C molecular cloud, observed using Herschel, revealed that dense cores and filamentary structures constitute a significant portion (40%) of its total mass. Among the identified cores, 149 are protostellar and 421 are starless. Interestingly, 78% of starless cores were found to be gravitationally bound prestellar cores. The Core Mass Function (CMF) exhibited an exponent (α = 1.35) identical to the Salpeter Initial Mass Function (IMF). Filament widths ranged from 0.15 pc to 0.63 pc, with a median of W = 0.3 ± 0.11 pc. A substantial fraction of filaments contained prestellar and protostellar cores, supporting the important role of filaments in prestellar core formation.

== See also ==
- Star Formation
- RCW 36
- RCW 38
- Rho Ophiuchi cloud complex
- Vela star-forming regions
