= Nuller =

Scientific Electronic Device

A nuller is an optical instrument, e.g., a beam combiner for nulling interferometry, used to block or cancel out a strong source so that fainter signals near that source can be observed. This is typically useful to detect off-axis exoplanet or exozodiacal dust by interferometrically nulling out the on-axis parent star.

The VLT interferometer’s visiting instrument Asgard's submodule NOTT (Nulling Observations of exoplaneTs and dusT) contains such a nuller to combine four telescope signals to perform nulling interferometry.

== Nulling interferometry ==
Nulling interferometry evolved from traditional stellar interferometry. The key difference is that it induces a 180-degree phase shift, for example, in one beam of a two-telescope interferometer. This creates destructive interference on the optical axis (where the star is) and constructive interference for off-axis objects (like planets). A technique initially proposed by Australian-American astronomer Ronald N. Bracewell in 1978.

A different technique is called a coronagraph, using a physical obstacle to block the unwanted signals.

== See also ==
- Coronagraph
- Interferometry
