= RCW 36 =

Emission nebula in the constellation of Vela

Nebula
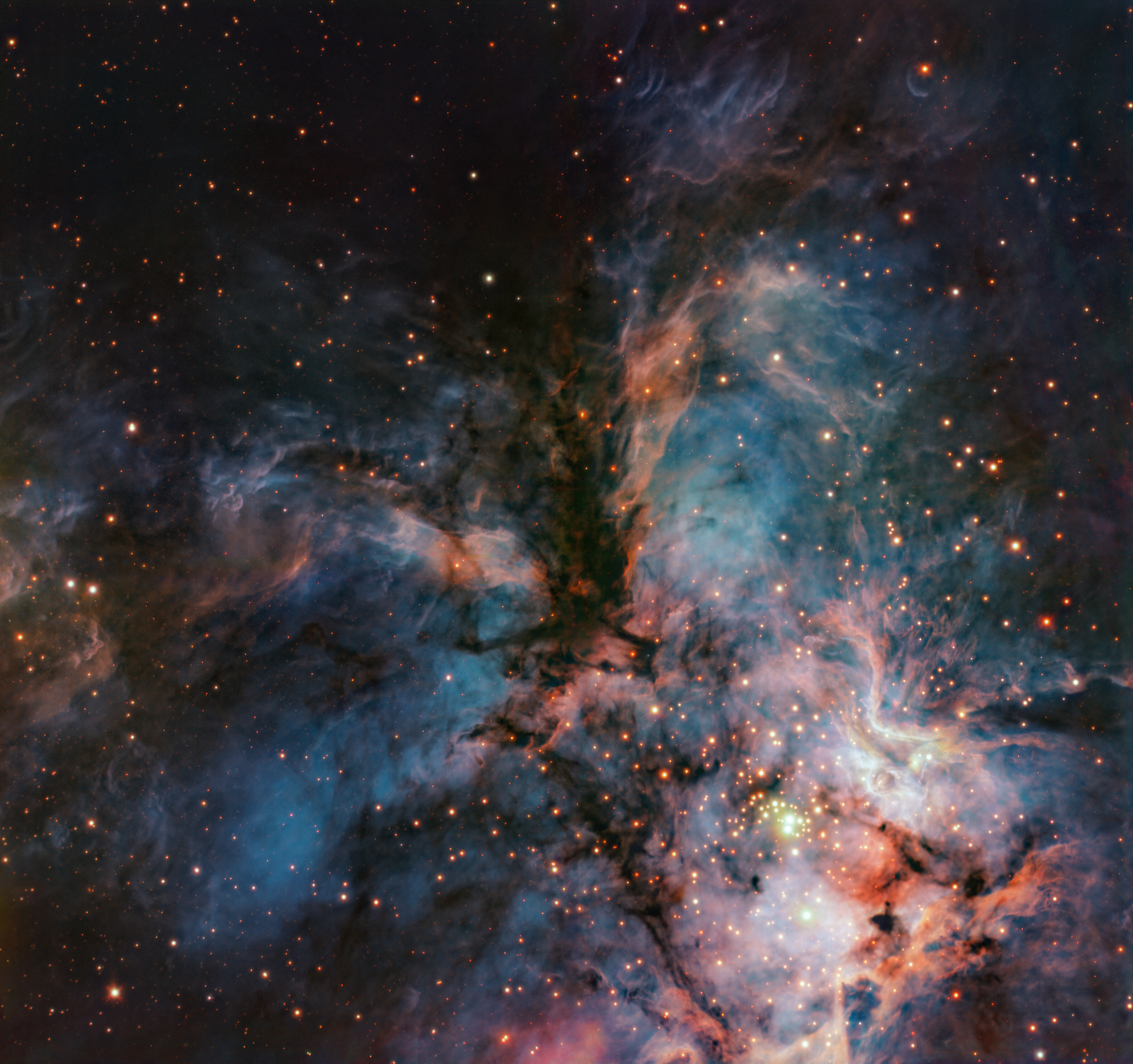
- RCW 36 imaged by the Hawk-I instrument on the VLT

Observation data: J2000 epoch
- Right ascension: 08^{h} 59^{m} 00.9^{s}
- Declination: −43° 44′ 10″
- Distance: 2300 ly (700 pc)
- Apparent dimensions (V): 5 arcmin
- Constellation: Vela
- Designations: RCW 36, Gum 20, BBW 217

RCW 36 (also designated Gum 20) is an emission nebula containing an embedded cluster in the constellation Vela. This H II region is part of a larger-scale star-forming complex known as the Vela Molecular Ridge (VMR), a collection of molecular clouds in the Milky Way that contain multiple sites of ongoing star-formation activity. The VMR is made up of several distinct clouds, and RCW 36 is embedded in the VMR Cloud C.

RCW 36 is one of the sites of massive-star formation closest to the Solar System, located at a distance of approximately 954 parsecs (3112 light-years). The most massive stars in the star cluster are two stars with late-O or early-B spectral types, but the cluster also contains hundreds of lower-mass stars and brown dwarfs. This region is also home to objects with Herbig–Haro jets, HH 1042 and HH 1043. It is about 1.1 million years old.

== Star formation in RCW 36 ==
Like most star-forming regions, the interstellar medium around RCW 36 contains both the gas from which stars form and some newly formed young stars. Here, young stellar clusters form in giant molecular clouds. Molecular clouds are the coldest, densest form of interstellar gas and are composed mostly of molecular hydrogen (H_{2}), but also include more complex molecules, cosmic dust, and atomic helium. Stars form when the mass gas in part of a cloud becomes too great, causing it to collapse due to the Jeans instability. Most stars do not form alone, but in groups containing hundreds or thousands of other stars. RCW 36 is an example of this type of "clustered" star formation.

== Molecular cloud and H II region ==
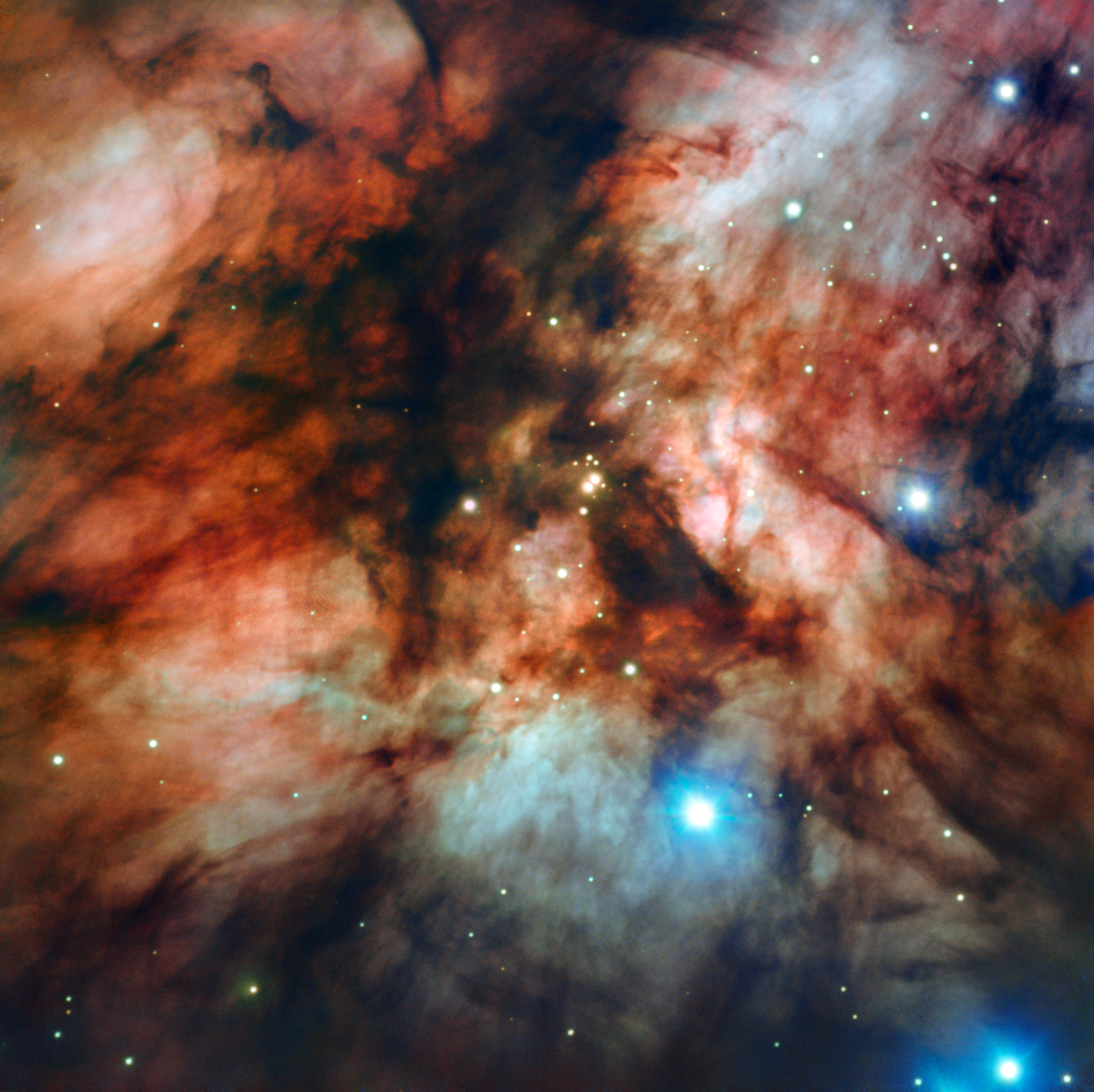
RCW 36 imaged by the VLT's FORS instrument

The Vela Molecular Ridge can be subdivided into several smaller clouds, each of which in turn can be subdivided into cloud "clumps". The molecular cloud clump from which the RCW 36 stars are forming is Clump 6 in the VMR C cloud.

Early maps of the region were produced by radio telescopes that traced emission from several types of molecules found in the clouds, including CO, OH, and H_{2}CO. More detailed CO maps were produced in the 1990s by a team of Japanese astronomers using the NANTEN millimeter-wavelength telescope. Using emission from C^{18}O, they estimated the total mass of Cloud C to be 44,000 M_{☉}. The cloud maps suggest that Cloud C is the youngest component of the VMR because of an ultra-compact H II region associated with RCW 36 and several sites of embedded protostars, while H II regions in other VMR clouds are more evolved. Observations from the Herschel Space Telescope show that the material within the cloud is organized into filaments and RCW 36 sits near the south end of a 10-parsec long filament.

Star formation in RCW 36 is currently ongoing. In the dense gas at the western edge of RCW 36, where the far-infrared emission is greatest, are found protostellar cores, the Herbig Haro objects, and an ultra-compact H II region. However, more deeply embedded star-formation is obscured by dust, so radiation can only escape from the cloud surface and not from the embedded objects themselves.

The H II region is an area around the cluster in which hydrogen atoms in the interstellar medium have been ionized by ultraviolet light from O- and B-type stars. The H II region in RCW 36 has an hourglass morphology, similar to the shape of H II regions around other young stellar clusters like W40 or Sh2-106. In addition, an ultra-compact H II region surrounds IRAS source 08576−4333.

== Star cluster ==
Due to its youth, most of the stars in RCW 36 are at an early stage of stellar evolution where they are known as young stellar objects or pre-main-sequence stars. These stars are still in the process of contraction before they reach the main sequence, and they may still have gas accreting onto them from either a circumstellar disk or envelope.

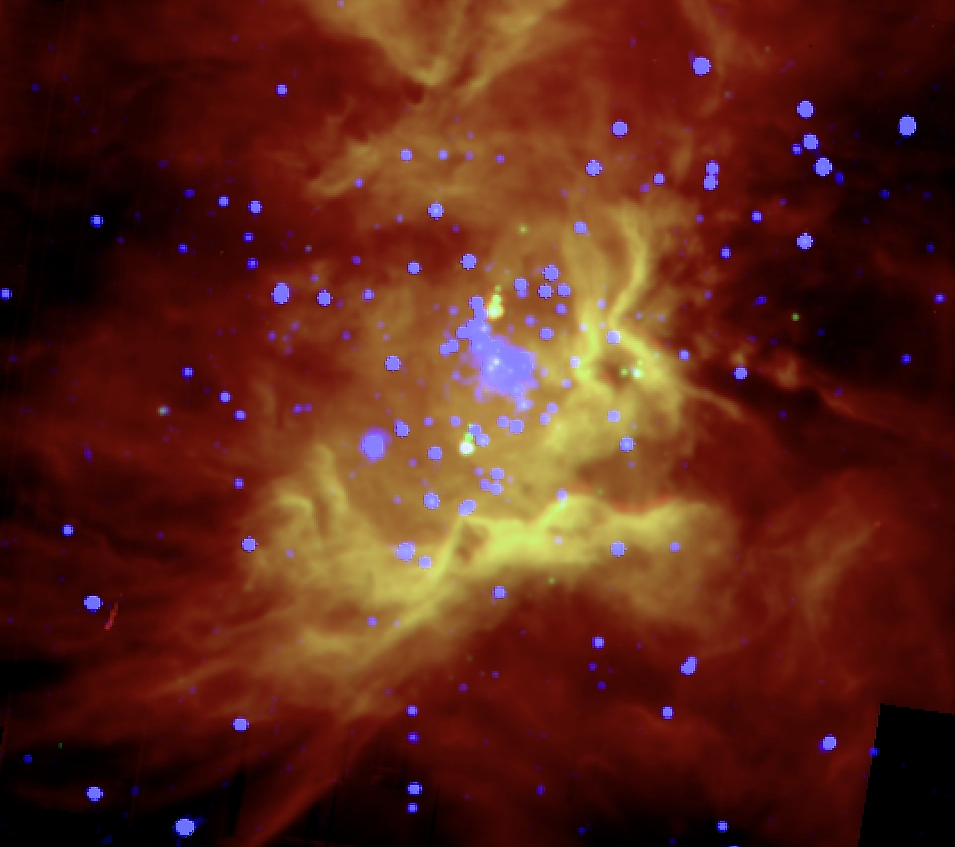
Young stars in RCW 36 are revealed in the X-ray (blue), while infrared images (red and green) show both stars and gas

Disentangling the actual members of the cluster from the background and foreground contaminants for such an embedded field is quite difficult, however, specially due to the presence of a group of ~ 50 bright massive stars near the centre of RCW 36, some information is known. Early observations by the TIFR 100-cm balloon-born telescope from the National Balloon Facility in Hyderabad, India, were able to uncover the brightest of the massive stars, including the pair of central ionizing O9 stars. In the early 2000s, infrared images in the J, H, and K_{s} bands have suggested at least 350 cluster members by subtracting from their field the expected number of background contaminants. Observations by NASA's Spitzer Space Telescope and Chandra X-ray Observatory were used to identify 385 candidate cluster members as part of the MYStIX survey of nearby star-forming regions. The modeling of the brightness of stars at various infrared wavelengths has shown 132 young stellar objects to have infrared excess consistent with circumstellar disks or envelopes. Spectroscopic data from the ESO instrument X-SHOOTER located in the Very Large Telescope confirmed the first 50 bonafide members of the cluster, from the pair of O9 and other massive stars to even some late-type stars. The same authors have also observed that the most massive sources are all located near the centre of the cluster, which had been noted before by Baba et al. (2004), and that at least half the observed sources showed evidence for infrared excess from a disk or envelope. Most recently, observations using the HAWK-I instrument at the ESO VLT facilities showed that a possibly rich population of 43-120 brown dwarfs might exist in the cluster, amidst a total population of approximately 426 candidate members. These authors have also determined the ratio of stars to brown dwarfs is between 2-5, which is consistent with other regions regardless of their inherent characteristics.

The cluster has been noted by Baba et al. for having a high density of stars, with star counts (the number of stars within an angular area of the sky) exceeding 3000 stars per square parsec at the center of the cluster. A measurement of central area density using the MYStIX catalog suggested approximately 10,000 stars per square parsec at the cluster center, but this study also suggested that such densities are not unusual for massive star-forming regions. The spatial distribution of stars has been described as a King profile or alternatively as a "core-halo" structure.

Stellar density near the center of RCW 36 has been estimated to be approximately 300,000 stars per cubic parsec (or 10,000 stars per cubic light year). In contrast, the density of stars in the Solar neighborhood is only 0.14 star per cubic parsec, so the density of stars at the center of RCW 36 is about 2 million times greater. It has been calculated that for young stellar clusters with more than 10^{4} stars pc.^{−3} close encounters between stars can lead to interactions between protoplanetary disks that affect developing planetary systems.

== Young stellar objects ==
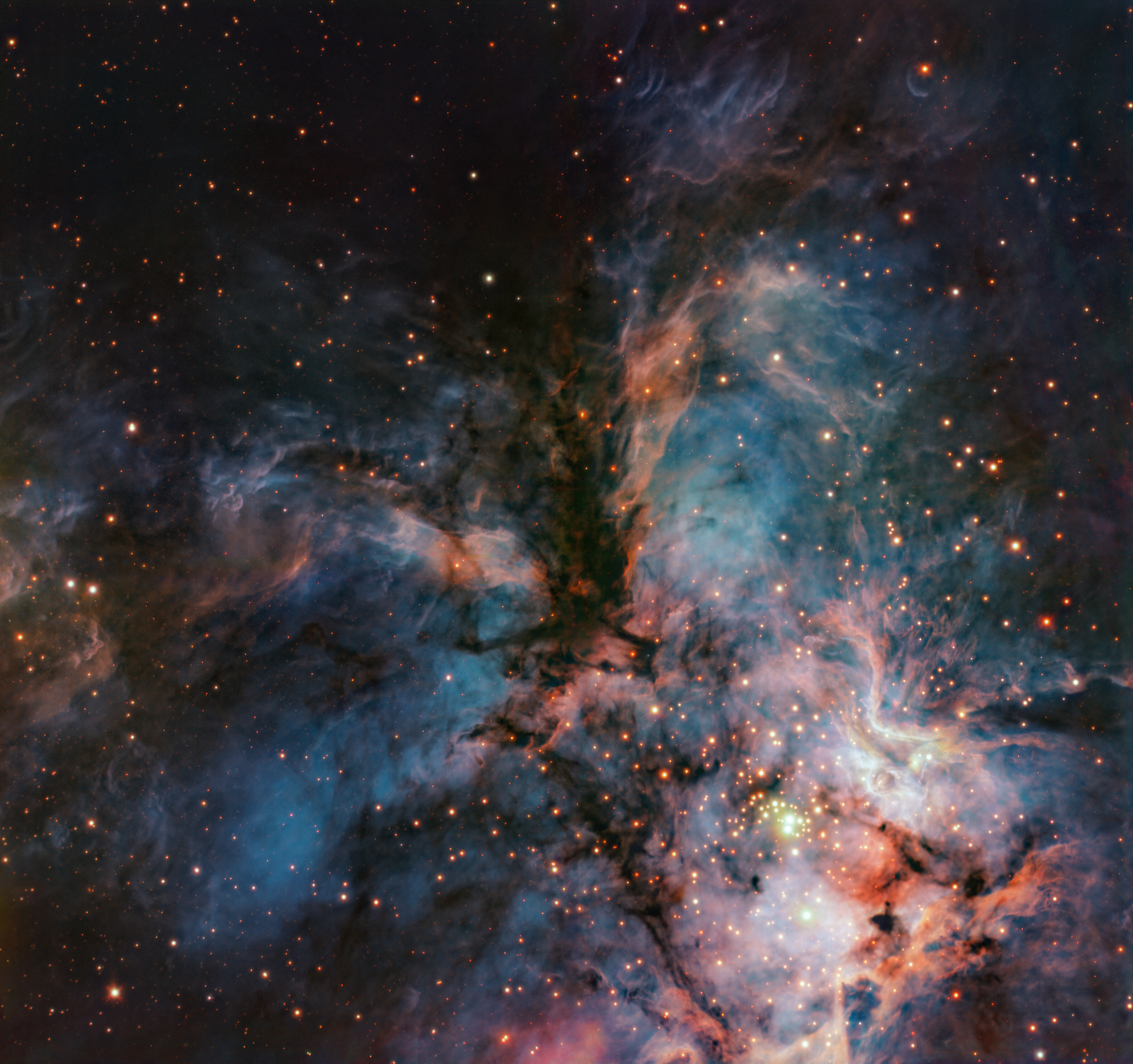
RCW 36 imaged by the Hawk-I instrument on the VLT

Several special types of young stellar object have been identified in RCW 36; the properties of these stars are related to their extreme youth.

Two stars in RCW 36 have Herbig-Haro jets (HH 1042 and HH 1043). Jets of gas flowing out from young stars can be produced by accretion onto a star. In RCW 36 these jets were seen in a number of spectral lines, including lines from hydrogen, helium, oxygen, nitrogen, sulfur, nickel, calcium, and iron. Mass loss rates from the jets have been estimated to be on the order of 10^{−7} M_{☉} solar masses per year. Inhomogeneities in the jets have been attributed to variable accretion rate on timescales of approximately 100 years.

The young star 2MASS J08592851-4346029 has been classified as a Herbig Ae star. Stars in this class are pre-main-sequence, intermediate-mass stars (spectral type A) with emission lines in their spectra from hydrogen. Observations indicate that 2MASS J08592851-4346029 has a bloated radius as would be expected for a young star that is still contracting. Some of the lines in its spectrum have a P Cygni profile indicating the presence of a stellar wind.

The young star CXOANC J085932.2−434602 was observed by the Chandra X-ray Observatory to have produced a large flare with a peak temperature greater than 100 million kelvins. Such "super hot" flares from young stars have been seen in other star-forming regions like the Orion Nebula.

== See also ==
- H II Region
- Star Formation
- Gum Catalog
- RCW Catalog
