= HD 73882 =

Eclipsing binary system in constellation Vela

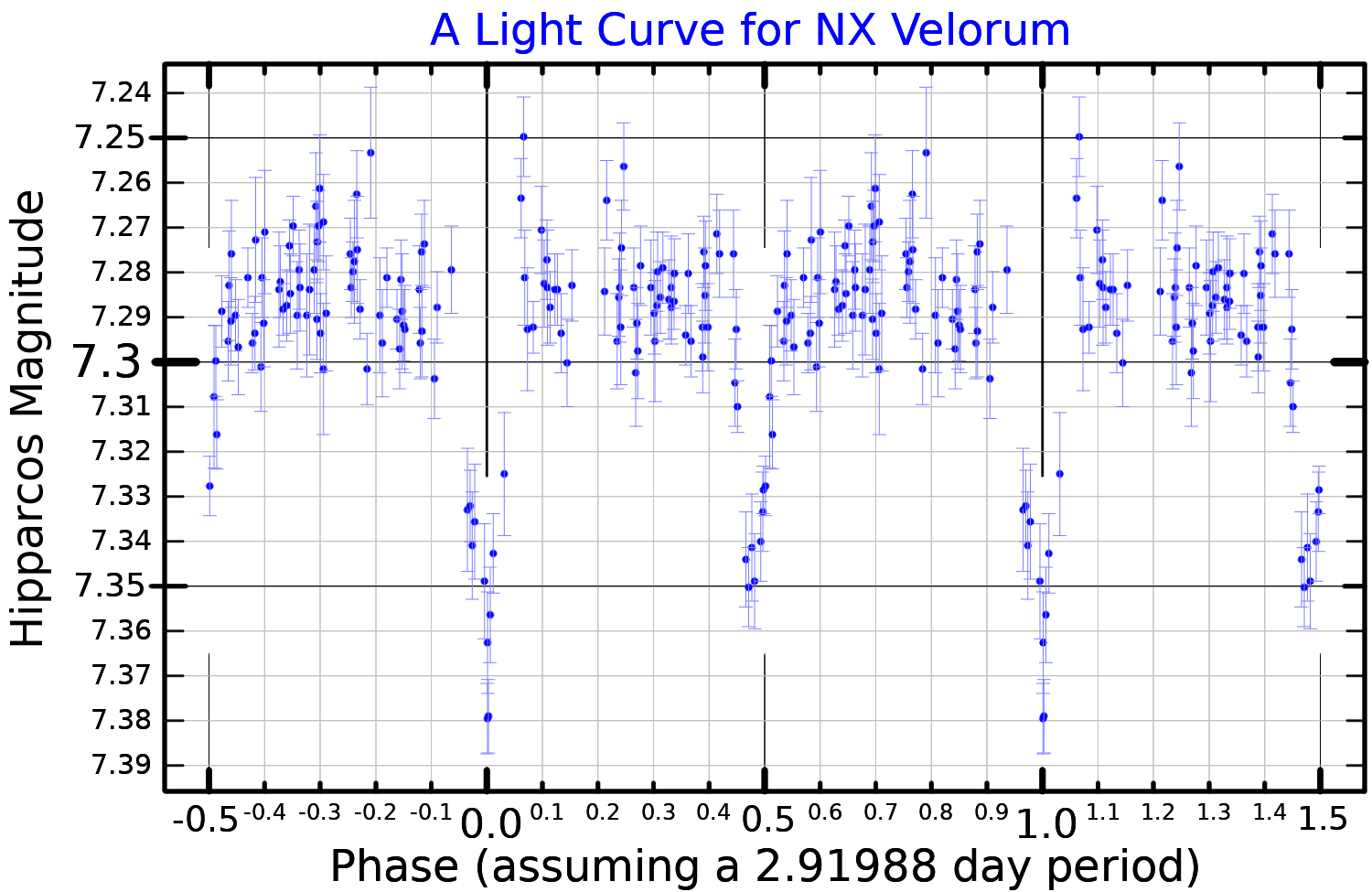
- A light curve for NX Velorum, plotted from Hipparcos data

Observation data Epoch J2000 Equinox ICRS
- Constellation: Vela
- Right ascension: 08^{h} 39^{m} 09.5341^{s}
- Declination: −40° 25′ 09.261″
- Apparent magnitude (V): 7.19 - 7.29

Characteristics
- Spectral type: O8.5IV
- Apparent magnitude (G): 7.36
- Variable type: eclipsing

Astrometry
Radial velocity (R_{v})	3.56±0.13 km/s
Proper motion (μ)	RA: −4.71±0.05 mas/yr Dec.: +3.44±0.06 mas/yr
Parallax (π)	1.34±0.06 mas
Distance	2,400 ± 100 ly (750 ± 30 pc)
Absolute magnitude (M_{V})	2.46±0.17

Details
Metallicity [Fe/H]	−0.60±0.10 dex

Other designations
- 2MASS J08390953-4025092, CD−39 4631, HIP 42433, GSC 07666-01830, PPM 313370, NX Vel
- HD 73882A: TYC 7666-1830-1, Gaia DR2 5528383187882877312
- HD 73882B: TYC 7666-1830-2, Gaia DR2 5528383192183392768

Database references
SIMBAD	data

HD 73882 is a visual binary system with the components separated by 0.6″ and a combined spectral class of O8. One of stars is an eclipsing binary system. The period of variability is listed as both 2.9199 days and 20.6 days, possibly due to the secondary being a spectroscopic binary star.

The system lies in the constellation of Vela about 2,400 light years away from the Sun and is a member of the open cluster Ruprecht 64.

== Components ==
The apparent magnitudes of the visible components A and B are 7.8 and 8.8 respectively. In 1996, analysis of the Hipparcos data showed that the system contained an eclipsing binary. It was given the variable star designation NX Velorum in 1999. The primary, A, is thought to be the eclipsing binary. It shows eclipses every 1.5 d, but there are thought to be both primary and secondary minima with the actual orbital period being 2.92 d. Additional radial velocity variations with a period of 20.6 d have also been found, suggesting that one of the components is a spectroscopic binary.

The spectral types of the individual components are not known. The observed combined spectral type is variously given as O8.5V, O9III, or O8.5IV. The spectrum is presumed to be dominated by the primary pair which are more than a magnitude brighter than the secondary. The eclipsing components are likely to be two similar stars since the primary and secondary eclipses are almost identical. One source gives the combined mass of the eclipsing pair as 26.6 M_{☉} and the mass of the secondary as 2.31 M_{☉}, with an orbital period of about 643 years, but this is highly speculative with no reliable orbits available and even the number of components uncertain.

== Circumstellar nebula ==
The star system, located behind the Vela Supernova Remnant, is obscured by the translucent nebula Gum 14, located near the Vela Molecular Ridge nebulae complex. The nebula is illuminated by this star system and probably has a close physical association with it, together with brighter reflection nebula NGC 2626. The nebulae are rich in hydrogen (including deuterated hydrogen) and also contain detectable amounts of sodium, carbon monoxide, and other carbon compounds, including polycyclic aromatic hydrocarbons, and thiols. The nebula associated with the HD 73882 is one of the few exhibiting emission from compounds containing three carbon atoms. The nebula has unusually low levels of oxygen compared to the average interstellar medium.
