= VLT =

VLT may stand for:

== Entertainment and media ==
- Vestmanlands Läns Tidning, a Swedish newspaper in Västerås
- Video lottery terminal, used to gamble on video games

== Science and technology ==
- Very Large Telescope, an astronomical observatory in Chile
- Virtual Link Trunking, a proprietary networking protocol
- Visible light transmission, in car windows or goggles

== Other uses ==
- Postal code for Valletta, Malta
- VLT (Rio de Janeiro), a light rail system in Brazil
- VLT sandwich, containing vegetarian bacon, lettuce and tomato—analogous with a BLT
