= NGC 2626 =

Reflection nebula in the constellation Vela

Reflection nebula
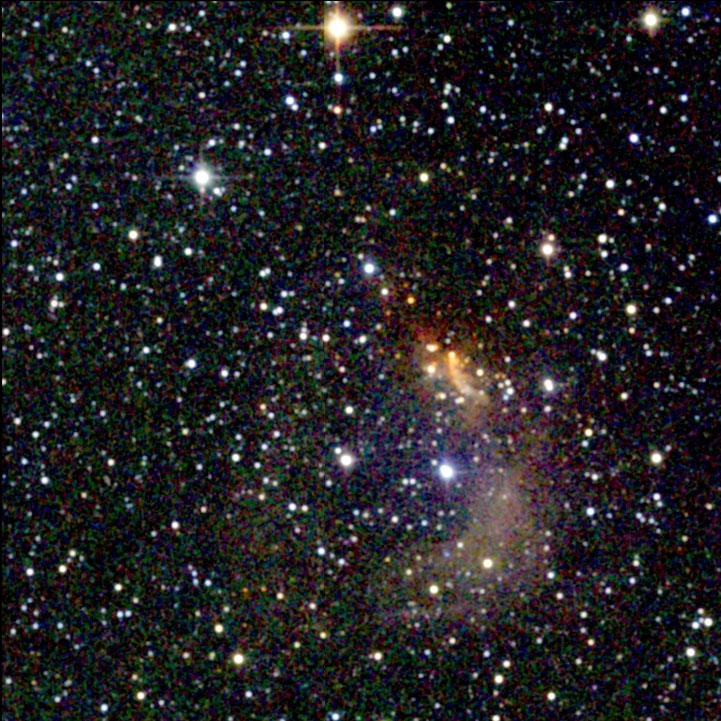
- Atlas Image mosaic of NGC 2626, which, at a distance of about 1 kpc (3300 light years), is primarily reflecting the light from the bright blue (B1-type) 10th-magnitude star, CD-40° 4432, which is embedded in it.

Observation data: J2000 epoch
- Right ascension: 08^{h} 35^{m} 32^{s}
- Declination: −40° 40′ 18″
- Distance: 3900 ± 1110 ly (1200 ± 340 pc)
- Apparent dimensions (V): 5.0′ × 5.0′
- Constellation: Vela
- Designations: NGC 2626, Ced 106h, GN 08.33.7, VdBH 17

NGC 2626 is a reflection nebula, emission nebula, and absorption nebula in the constellation Vela. It is mostly illuminated by B1 star CD-40 4432 and ionized by the O8 quadruple star system HD 73882, together with other stars.

== Gallery ==
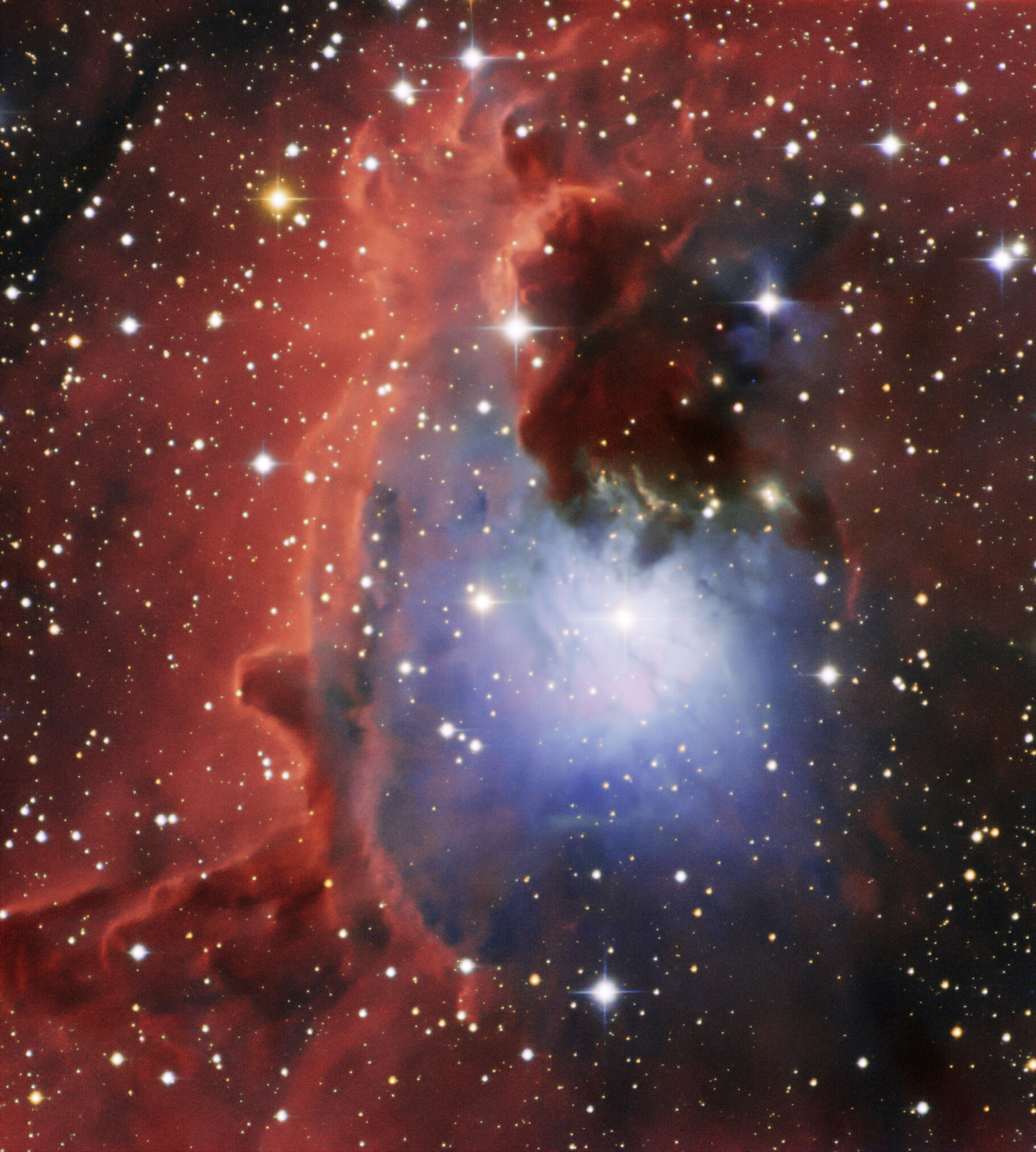
This image has been produced using observations made at the SMARTS 0.9-meter Telescope at the Cerro Tololo Inter-American Observatory (CTIO)

== See also ==
- H II Region
- Star Formation
