= Gum 15 =

Emission nebula in the constellation Vela

Emission nebula
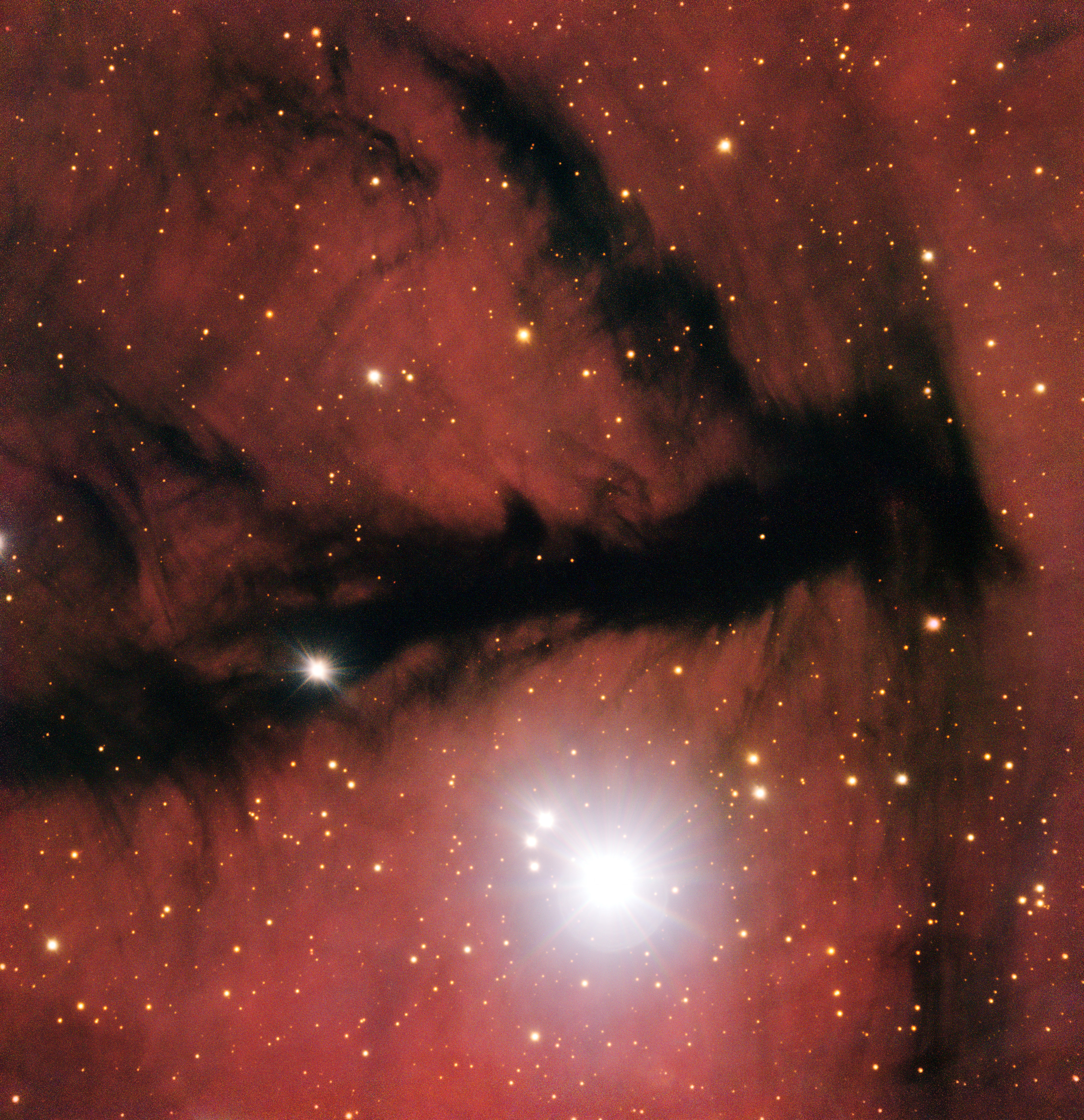
- Wide-field image of Gum 15 with the Wide Field Imager on the MPG/ESO 2.2-meter telescope at the La Silla Observatory

Observation data: J2000 epoch
- Right ascension: 08^{h} 43^{m} 52.5^{s}
- Declination: −41° 14′ 39″
- Designations: BRAN 176, GRS G261.60 +00.90, RCW 32

Gum 15 is a nebula from the Gum catalog, located in the constellation of Vela, about 3,000 light-years from Earth. It is shaped by aggressive winds flowing from the stars within and around it. The bright star in the center of the nebula is HD 74804, a double star.
