= 9 Sagittarii =

Star in the constellation Sagittarius

- Location of 9 Sagittarius (circled)

Observation data Epoch J2000 Equinox ICRS
- Constellation: Sagittarius
- Right ascension: 18^{h} 03^{m} 52.44501^{s}
- Declination: −24° 21′ 38.6323″
- Apparent magnitude (V): 5.97

Characteristics
- Spectral type: O4V((f))z (O3.5V((f+)) + O5–5.5V((f)))
- U−B color index: −0.89
- B−V color index: 0.00

Astrometry
| Radial velocity (R_{v}) | 10.70 km/s |
| Proper motion (μ) | RA: +0.539 mas/yr Dec.: −2.019 mas/yr |
| Parallax (π) | 0.8001±0.0728 mas |
| Distance | 4,270 ± 200 ly (1,310±60 pc) |
| Absolute magnitude (M_{V}) | −6.20 |

Orbit
| Period (P) | 3,261±69 d |
| Semi-major axis (a) | 4,100 R_{☉} |
| Eccentricity (e) | 0.648±0.009 |
| Inclination (i) | 86.5±0.5° |
| Semi-amplitude (K_{1}) (primary) | 36+4 −1 km/s |
| Semi-amplitude (K_{2}) (secondary) | 49±3 km/s |

Details

9 Sgr A
| Mass | 53+7 −6 M_{☉} |
| Radius | 10.73+0.79 −0.61 R_{☉} |
| Luminosity | 10^{5.67+0.06 −0.07} L_{☉} |
| Surface gravity (log g) | 4.10+0.02 −0.06 cgs |
| Temperature | 46,000+600 −1,000 K |
| Rotational velocity (v sin i) | 102+8 −12 km/s |
| Age | 1.0+0.8 −0.4 Myr |

9 Sgr B
| Mass | 39+6 −3 M_{☉} |
| Radius | 8.73+0.75 −0.67 R_{☉} |
| Luminosity | 10^{5.33+0.08 −0.06} L_{☉} |
| Surface gravity (log g) | 4.12+0.06 −0.07 cgs |
| Temperature | 41,900±1,900 K |
| Rotational velocity (v sin i) | 67+6 −13 km/s |
| Age | 1.0+0.5 −0.6 Myr |

Other designations
- 9 Sgr, HR 6736, HIP 88469, HD 164794, CD−24°13814, 2MASS J18035245-2421386, WDS J18039-2422

Database references
| SIMBAD | data |

9 Sagittarii (9 Sgr) is a massive binary star in the constellation Sagittarius. It has an apparent magnitude of 5.97. Both components are highly luminous O-type main-sequence stars.

== Surroundings ==
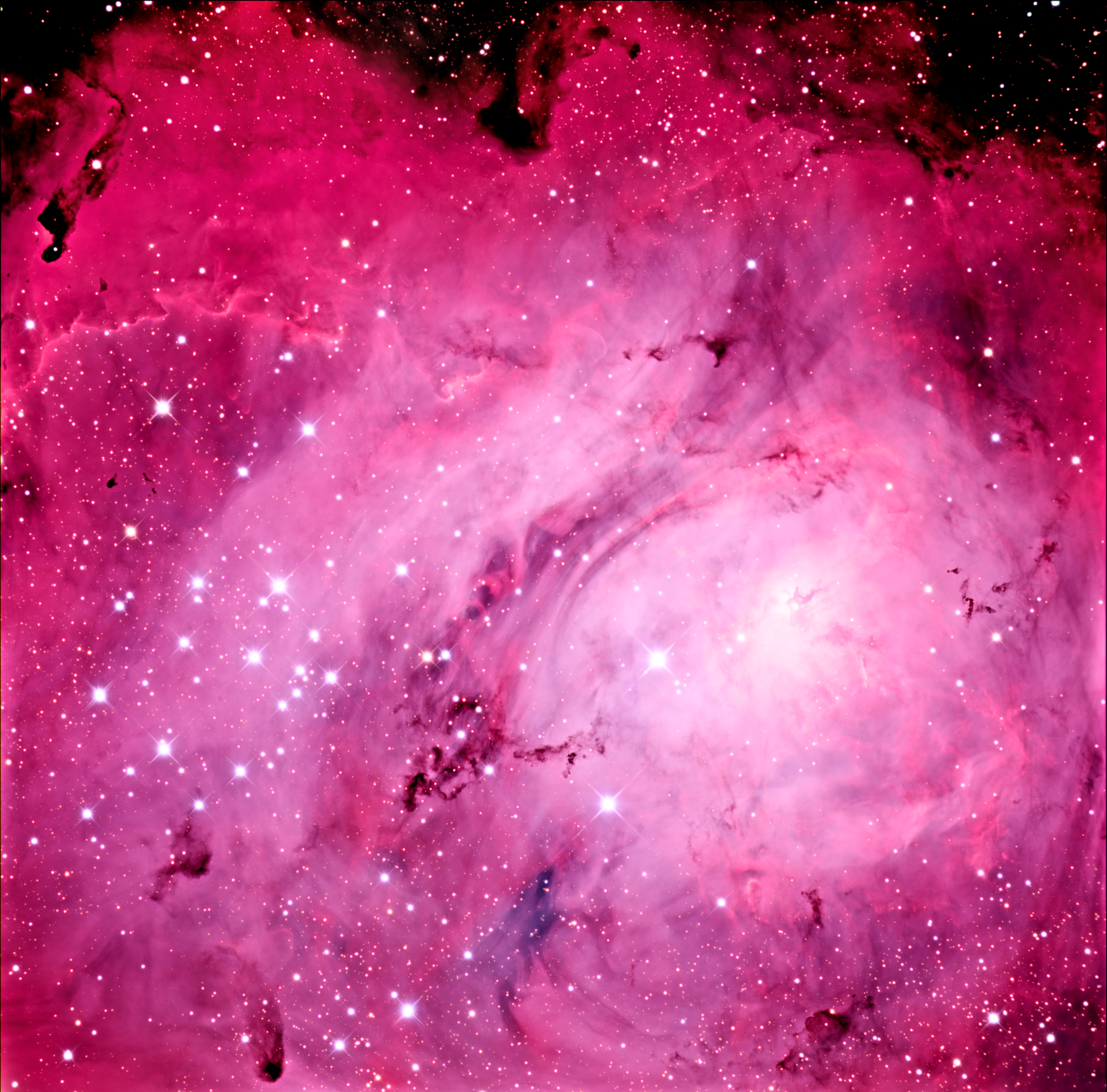
9 Sgr is the brightest star in the image, just left of the intense Hourglass Nebula core of the Lagoon Nebula. The scattering of stars on the left is NGC 6530.

9 Sgr is a naked eye star lying in the direction of the Lagoon Nebula (Messier 8), very close to the central condensation of the Hourglass Nebula around Herschel 36. It was not catalogued by Bayer with a Greek letter, but was listed by Flamsteed as number 9 in the constellation Sagittarius. It lies close to the open cluster NGC 6530. 9 Sgr is the main source of ionisation for much of the visible nebulosity in the region, although the young O star Herschel 36 ionises the dense Hourglass Nebula region.

9 Sgr itself is surrounded by an ionised H_{II} region about 30 light years across including the reflection nebulae NGC 6523 and NGC 6533. This ionised region lies in front of a denser molecular cloud.

The distances to 9 Sgr, M8, and NGC 6530 are uncertain, but generally estimated to be between 1,200 and 1,800 parsecs. Recent studies derive a distance around 1,250 pc for the M8 region. Erosion of the front of the molecular cloud apparently caused by 9 Sgr suggests that it lies in front of the cloud, but studies of 9 Sgr as a binary star give a distance of 1,790 pc. A 2021 study of the binary system derives a distance of 1,310±60 pc. On this basis, it is thought to be a member of the NGC 6530 open cluster.

== System ==
9 Sagittarii is a binary system with the longest known period for a pair of class O stars at 9.1 years. The orbit is eccentric and the separation between the stars varies from 11 AU to 27 AU. The large separation means that the stellar winds of the two stars do not impact strongly and so the pair are not a strong source of x-rays. Lack of x-rays, low orbital velocities, and similar spectral types merging to a combined spectrum of O4V, mean that 9 Sgr was only confirmed to be a binary in 2012. Earlier clues such as nonthermal radio emission and periodic spectral line profile variations had prompted the detail search for a companion.

The two stars have been resolved using the Hubble Space Telescope Fine Guidance Sensor and with ground-based interferometry using the Very Large Telescope PIONIER instrument.

== Properties ==
Both components of 9 Sgr are massive main sequence class O stars, and both have effective temperatures above 40,000 K. Each emits several hundred thousand times the luminosity of the Sun. At an age of about one million years, both are still main sequence stars fusing hydrogen in their cores, although strong convection have enriched the surface with nitrogen and helium which are visible in the spectrum. The powerful stellar winds produce emission lines in their spectra.
