= Sh 2-12 =

Emission nebula

Sharpless 2-12
Nebula
- H II region
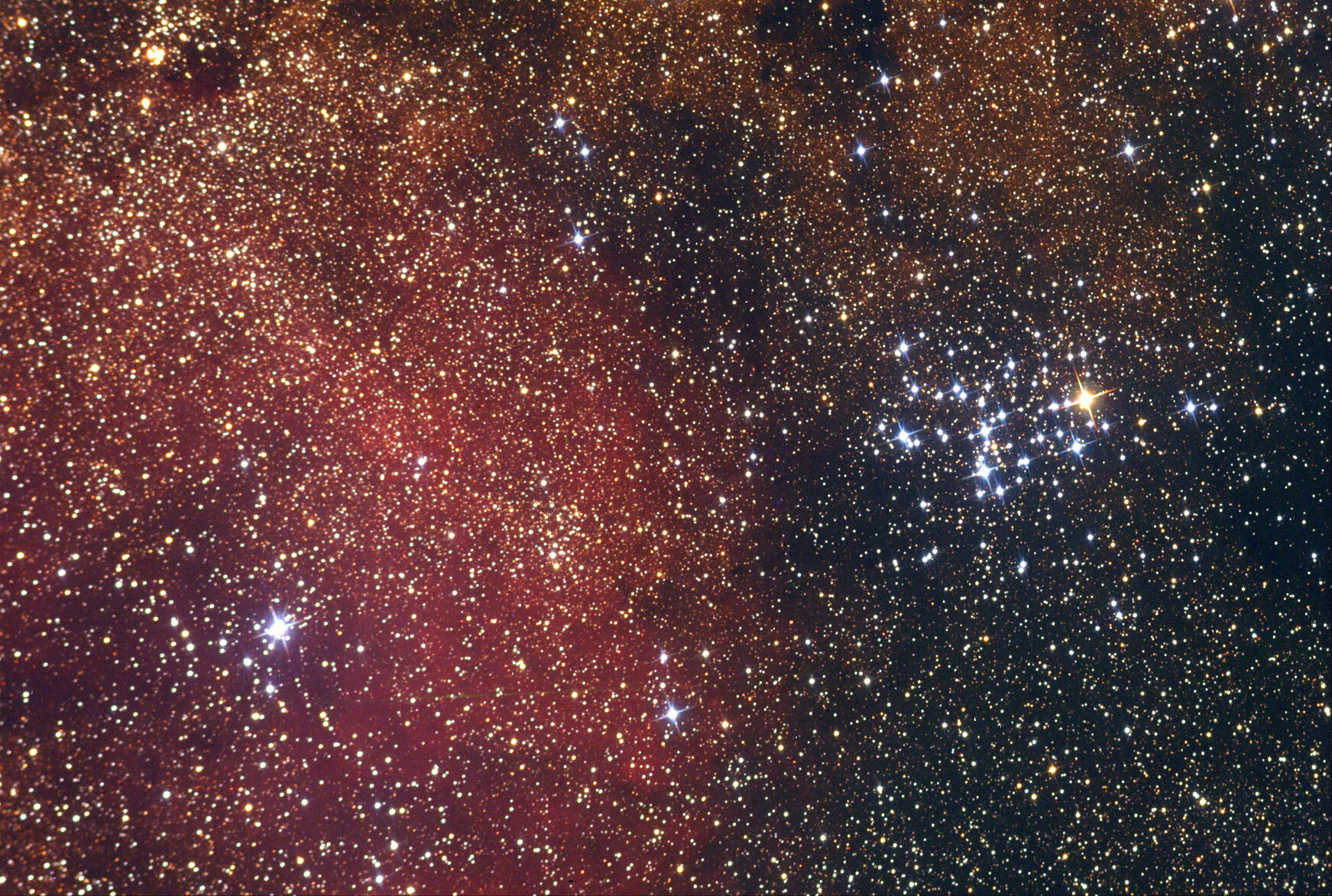
- Sh 2-12 (left) and Messier 6 (right)

Observation data: epoch
- Right ascension: 17^{h} 35^{m} 45^{s}
- Declination: −32° 35′ 05″
- Distance: 3210 ly (1300±100 pc)
- Apparent diameter: 120' x 120'

Physical characteristics
- Radius: 112 ly
- Designations: RCW 132, Gum 67, IRAS 17324-3233, LBN 1116

Sh 2-12 is an emission nebula in Scorpius. It was discovered by Stewart Sharpless in 1951 as he began to work on his catalog of nebulae, which would become the Sharpless Catalog.

This nebula is ionized by the star HD 159176, which is located in the open cluster NGC 6383. NGC 6383, along with the smaller Trumpler 28, are both located within the nebula. Messier 6 is only one degree away.
