= NGC 6544 =

Globular cluster in the constellation Sagittarius

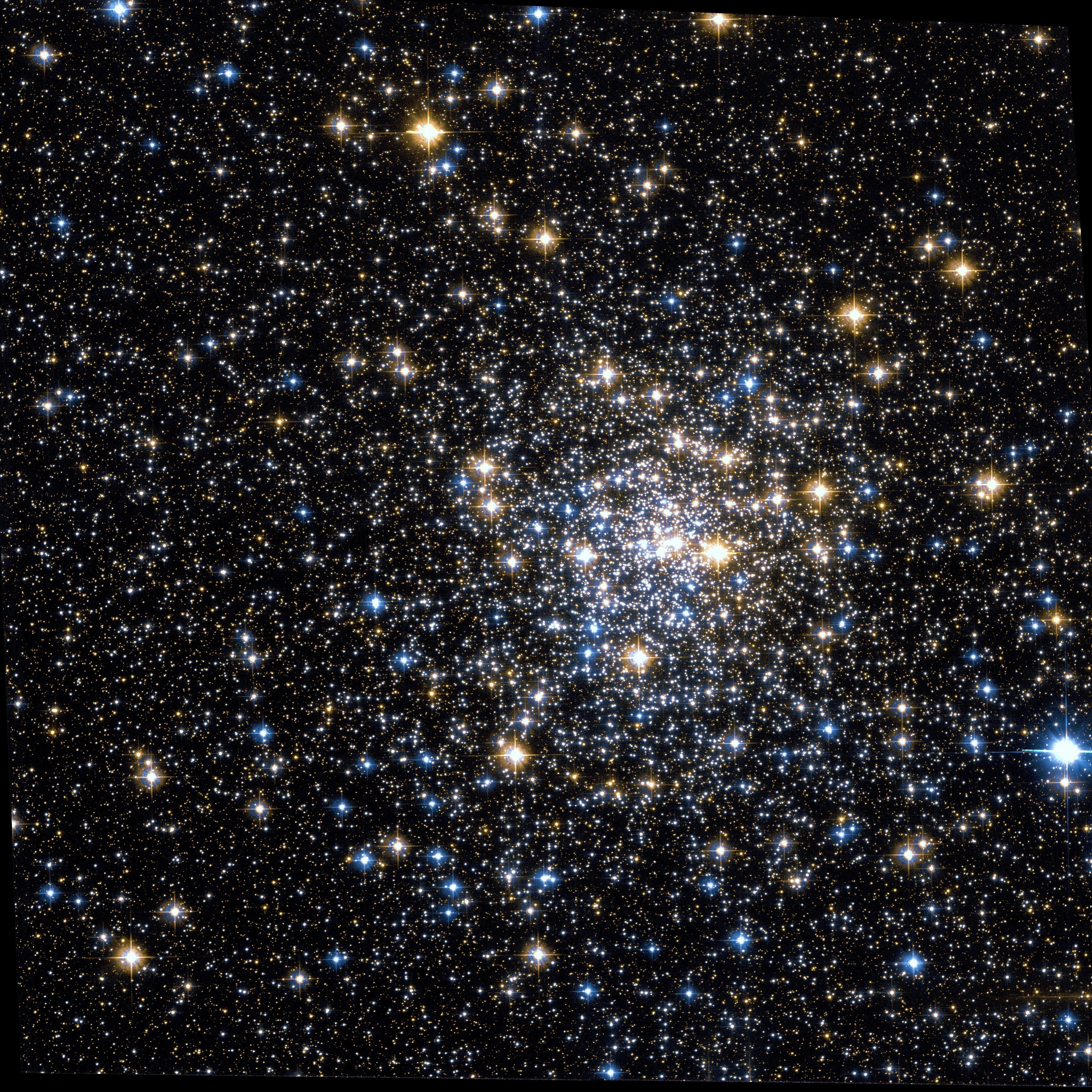
- NGC 6544 imaged by the Hubble Space Telescope

Observation data (J2000 epoch)
- Constellation: Sagittarius
- Right ascension: 18^{h} 07^{m} 21^{s}
- Declination: −24° 59′ 50″
- Distance: 9450 light years
- Apparent magnitude (V): 9
- Apparent dimensions (V): 1'

Physical characteristics
- Other designations: Cr 366, GCl 87

NGC 6544 is a small globular cluster visible in the constellation Sagittarius. It is magnitude 7.5, diameter 1 arcminute. It is less than 1 degree southeast of Messier 8, the Lagoon Nebula.

== Observation ==
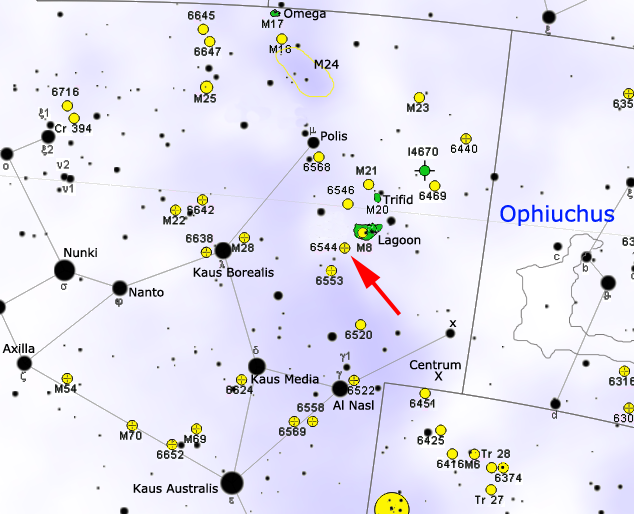
Map to find NGC 6544

NGC 6544 is located in the western part of the constellation, on the edge of a rich star field; its location is easily recoverable as it is located just 50' towards the southeast compared to the famous Lagoon Nebula. It can also be seen with 10×50mm binoculars as a small white spot like a misty star; with a telescope of 120mm and 100× magnification a few small stars may be resolved. Telescopes from 200mm up allow resolving of dozens of dim stars.

Because its declination is rather southern, this cluster can be mainly observed by observers located in the Southern Hemisphere, although it is still observable even up to medium temperate latitudes. The best time for observation in the evening sky is between June and October.

== History of observations ==
NGC 6544 was observed for the first time by William Herschel in 1784, who looked at it through his 18.4 inch reflector; he described it as a fairly bright and large object, circular and resolvable into stars; the New General Catalogue provides a similar description.

== Characteristics ==
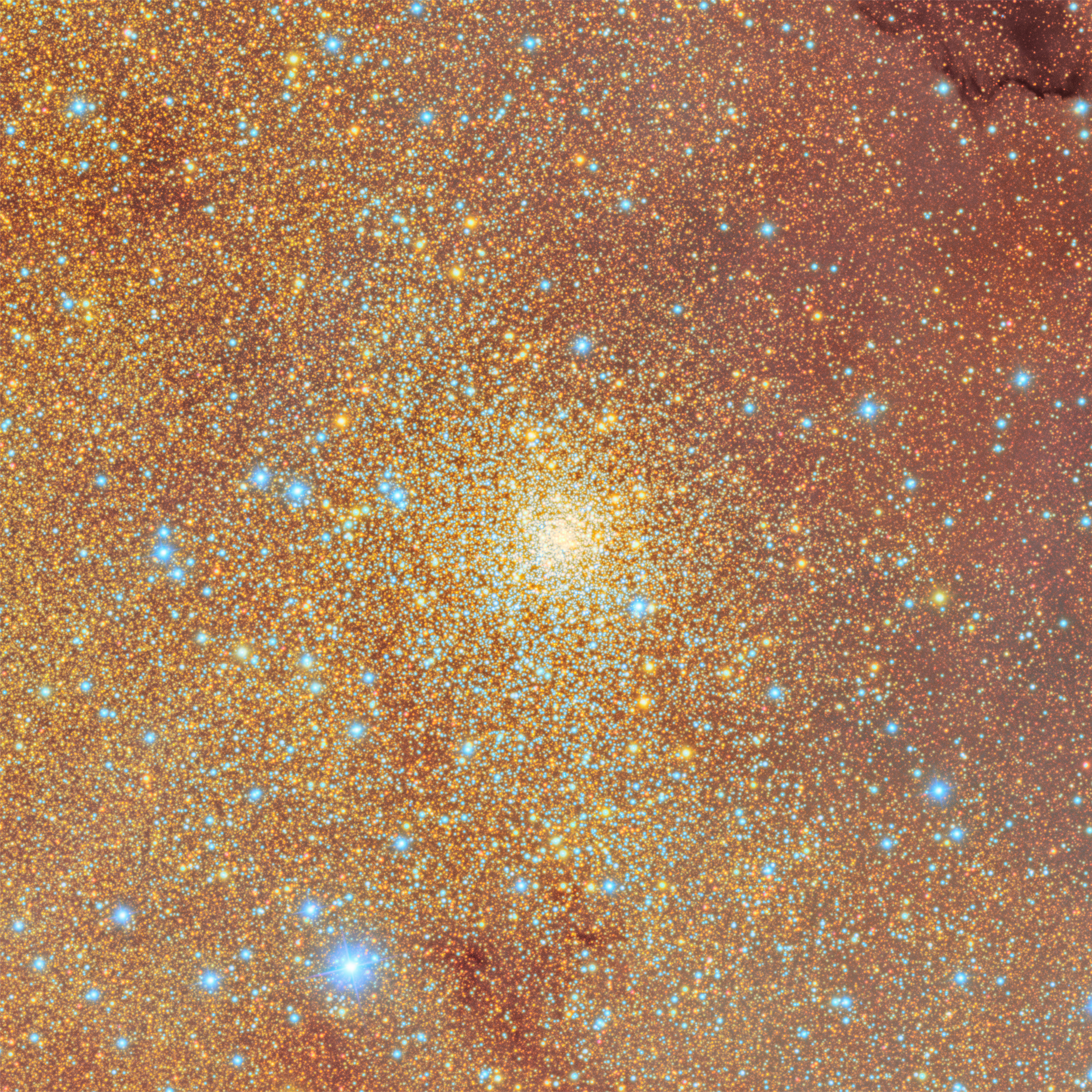
NGC 6544 imaged by the Vera C. Rubin Observatory

NGC 6544 is a globular cluster of medium density, estimated value of 5 on a scale between 1 and 12. Its distance is estimated at 2900 parsecs (9450 light years) from the Sun, which in its position corresponds to a distance of 6100 parsecs from the center of the Milky Way and only 100 parsecs from the galactic plane, making it one of the closest globular clusters to the galactic plane known. Its small angular size, equal to just under 4' for the main body volume and corresponding to just 3.2 parsecs, makes it also one of the smaller globular clusters known.

NGC 6544 has a prograde orbit around the Milky Way, but its orbit is otherwise unusual, and it has a high proper motion. It is unclear whether it formed with the Milky Way or came from elsewhere. In 2021, a low-luminosity globular cluster, named VVV CL160, was discovered with a similar location, metallicity, and trajectory. It may be associated with NGC 6544.

In 1999 a millisecond pulsar in a binary system was discovered within the cluster and cataloged as PSR J1807-2459. There are a few notable variable stars that part of NGC 6544; a 1993 study focused on the region around NGC 6544 has identified some variable stars, of which only one is found to belong in storage: it is a RR Lyrae variable with a period of 0.57 days.
