= O-type main-sequence star =

Main-sequence star of spectral type O

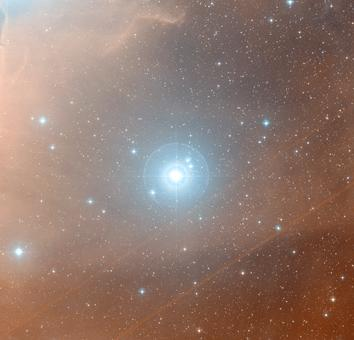
- Sigma Orionis is a rare example of a quintuple star system. The largest star in the system, σ Ori A, is an O-type main-sequence star.

Characteristics
- Type: Class of very large, bright, and rare main sequence star.
- Mass range: 20–83+ M_{☉}
- Temperature: 33,300–51,000+ K
- Average luminosity: 66,000–1.2×10^{6}+ L_{☉}

External links
- Media category
- Q1222876

An O-type main-sequence star (Note: Also called an "O-type dwarf" or "blue dwarf") is a main-sequence—core hydrogen-burning—star of spectral type O. The spectral luminosity class is V, although class O main sequence stars often have spectral peculiarities due to their extreme luminosity. These stars have between 15 and 90 times the mass of the Sun and surface temperatures between 30,000 and 50,000 K. They are between 40,000 and 1,000,000 times as luminous as the Sun.

== Spectral standard stars ==
Spectrum of an O5V star

Properties of typical O-type main-sequence stars
Spectral type	Mass (M_{☉})	Radius (R_{☉})	Luminosity (L_{☉})	Effective temperature (K)	Color index (B − V)
O3V	59	13.43	660,693	45,900	−0.330
O4V	48	12.13	448,745	42,900	−0.326
O5V	43	11.45	346,737	41,400	−0.323
O6V	35	10.27	231,206	39,800	−0.321
O7V	28	9.42	151,356	37,900	−0.318
O8V	23.6	8.47	98,175	35,100	−0.315
O9V	20.2	7.72	66,069	33,300	−0.312

The "anchor" standards which define the MK classification grid for O-type main-sequence stars, i.e. those standards which have not changed since the early 20th century, are S Monocerotis (O7 V) and 10 Lacertae (O9 V).

The Morgan–Keenan–Kellerman (MKK) "Yerkes" atlas from 1943 listed O-type standards between O5 and O9, but only split luminosity classes for the O9s. The two MKK O9 V standards were Iota Orionis and 10 Lacertae. The revised Yerkes standards ("MK") presented listed in Johnson & Morgan (1953) presented no changes to the O5 to O8 types, and listed 5 O9 V standards (HD 46202, HD 52266, HD 57682, 14 Cephei, 10 Lacertae) and 3 O9.5 V standards (HD 34078, Sigma Orionis, Zeta Ophiuchi). An important review on spectral classification by Morgan & Keenan (1973) listed "revised MK" standards for O4 to O7, but again no splitting of standards by luminosity classes. This review also listed main-sequence "dagger standards" of O9 V for 10 Lacertae and O9.5 V for Sigma Orionis.

O-type luminosity classes for subtypes earlier than O5 were not defined with standard stars until the 1970s. The spectral atlas of Morgan, Abt, & Tapscott (1978) defined listed several O-type main-sequence (luminosity class "V") standards: HD 46223 (O4 V), HD 46150 (O5 V), HD 199579 (O6 V), S Monocerotis (O7 V), HD 46149 (O8 V), and HD 46202 (O9 V). Walborn & Fitzpartrick (1990) provided the first digital atlas of spectra for OB-type stars, and included a main-sequence standard for O3 V (HDE 303308). Spectral class O2 was defined in Walborn et al. (2002), with the star BI 253 acting as the O2 V primary standard (actually type "O2 V((f*))"). They also redefined HDE 303308 as an O4 V standard, and listed new O3 V standards (HD 64568 and LH 10-3058).

== Properties ==
These are exceedingly rare objects; it is estimated that there are no more than 20,000 class O stars in the entire Milky Way, around one in 10,000,000 of all stars. Of the few there are, all class O stars are very young – no more than a few million years old – and in our galaxy they all have high metallicities, around twice that of the sun. Their masses range between 15 and 90 M_{☉}, but their radii are more modest at around 10 R_{☉}. Surface gravities are around 10 times that of the Earth, which is relatively low compared to other main sequence stars.

Class O main sequence stars' surface temperatures fall between 30,000 and 50,000 K. They are intensely bright: their bolometric luminosities are between 30,000 and 1,000,000 L_{☉}. Visual absolute magnitudes range from about −4 (eqv. 3,400 times brighter than the sun) to about −5.8 (eqv. 18,000 times brighter than the sun).

Their light-driven stellar winds have a terminal velocity around 2,000 km/s. The most luminous class O stars have mass loss rates of more than a millionth M_{☉} each year, although the least luminous lose far less. O-type main sequence stars in the Large Magellanic Cloud have lower metallicity (which makes their interiors less opaque than typical stars in the Milky Way) and noticeably higher temperatures, with the most obvious cause being lower mass loss rates, reduced because of their lower opacity.

== Examples of O-class main sequence stars ==
- θ Muscae is a naked-eye Wolf–Rayet star, but the majority of the visible light is produced by an O-class main sequence companion and an OB supergiant.
- 9 Sagittarii is a spectroscopic binary containing O3.5 and O5–5.5 main sequence stars, making for the brightest star visible within the Lagoon Nebula.
- μ Columbae is a naked-eye O9.5 main sequence star. It is a runaway star.
- θ^{1} Orionis C is the brightest star in the Trapezium Cluster in the Orion Nebula, an O6 main sequence star with a fainter spectroscopic companion.
- ζ Ophiuchi is an O9.5 main sequence star, the brightest in the sky at 3rd magnitude.
- υ Orionis is a main sequence star of spectral type O9.7, although it has sometimes been given the spectral type B0V
- Plaskett's Star, a massive binary consisting of two O-class stars in orbit around each other and also one of the most massive binaries known.

== Planets ==
As of 2026, no planets have been discovered around O-type main-sequence stars; this is because of their short lifespans. However, one example of an O-type main-sequence star with a brown dwarf has been discovered, and is named CEN 16.

== See also ==
- Star count, survey of stars
- Wolf–Rayet star
