= CEN 16 =

O-type dwarf star in the Omega Nebula

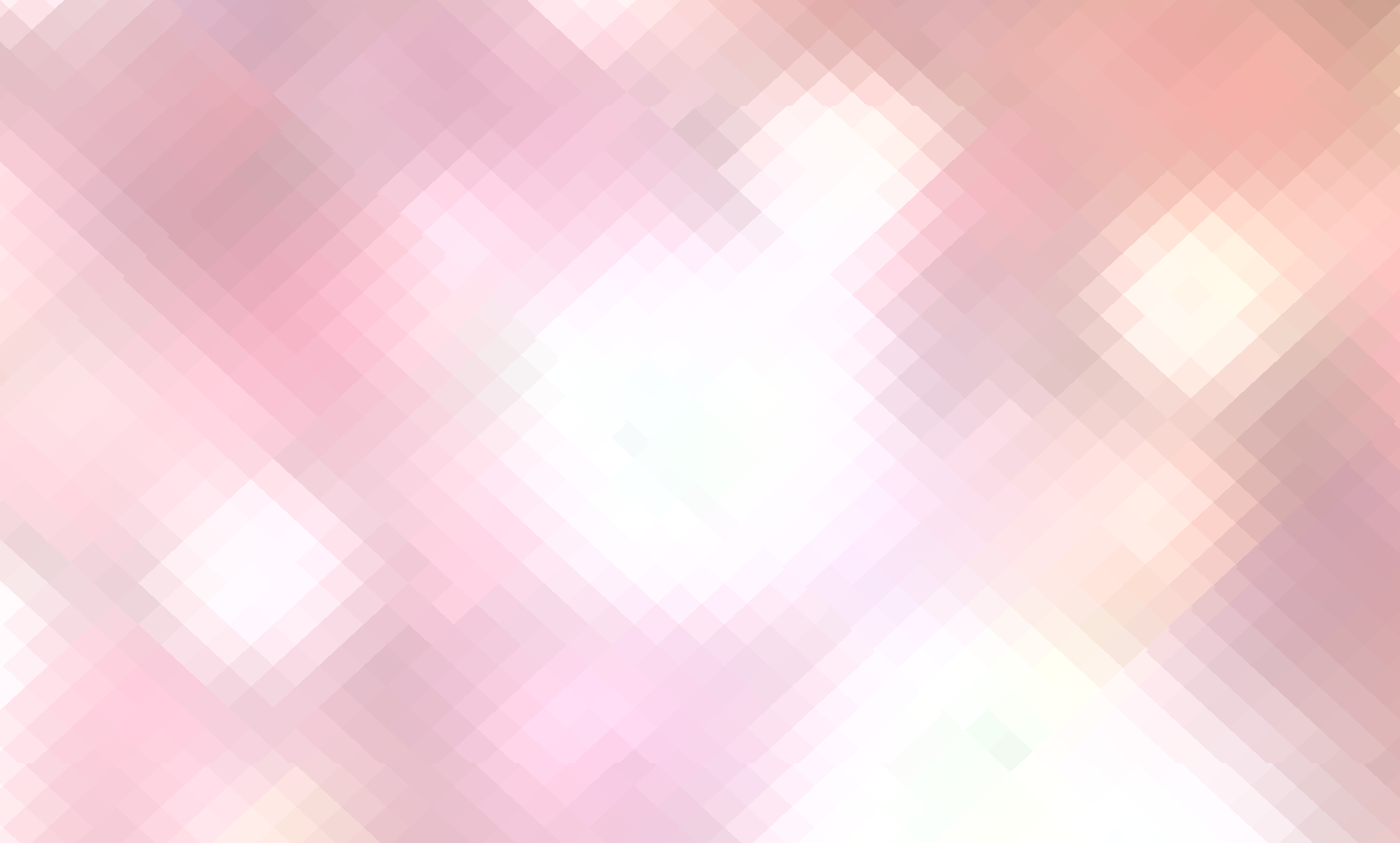
- 2MASS image of CEN 16

Observation data Epoch J2000.0 Equinox ICRS
- Constellation: Sagittarius
- Right ascension: 18^{h} 20^{m} 22.70^{s}
- Declination: −16° 08′ 34.2″
Apparent magnitude (V)	13.69	

Characteristics
- Evolutionary stage: Main sequence
- Spectral type: O8.5V
- Apparent magnitude (G): 12.61
- Apparent magnitude (K): 8.884

Astrometry
Proper motion (μ)	RA: 0.339±0.022 mas/yr Dec.: −1.599±0.015 mas/yr
Parallax (π)	0.7051±0.0226 mas
Distance	4,600 ± 100 ly (1,420 ± 50 pc)

Details
Mass	20.4+7.9 −7.3 M_{☉}
Radius	10.9 R_{☉}
Luminosity	125000±37000 L_{☉}
Surface gravity (log g)	4.24+0.16 −0.22 cgs
Temperature	34000±1000 K
Rotational velocity (v sin i)	30+15 −25 km/s
Age	4 Myr

Other designations
- NGC 6618 258, ALS 19608, B311, SLS 165, Gaia DR2 4098003291268883584, Gaia DR3 4098003291268883584

Database references
SIMBAD	data

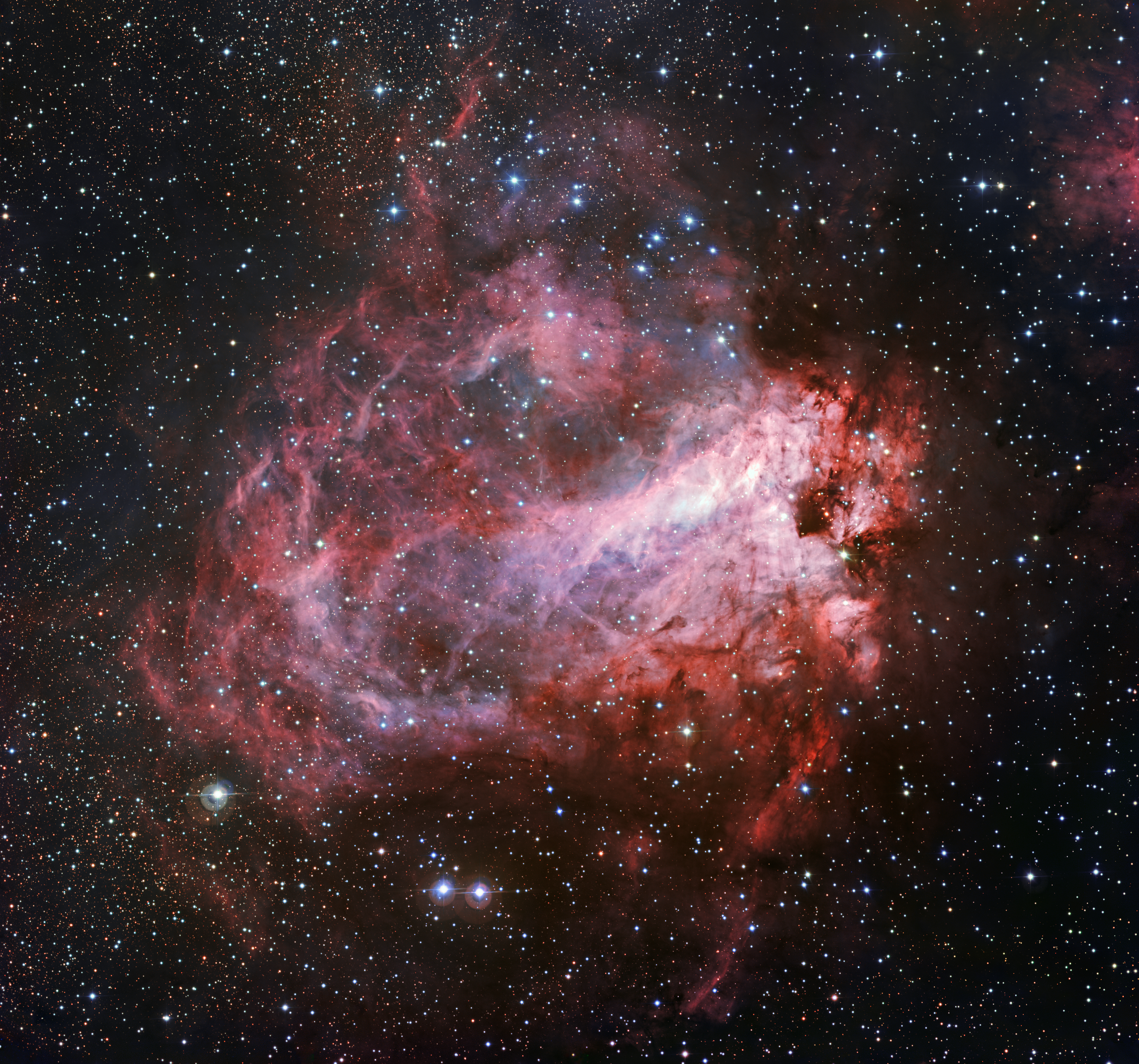
CEN 16 is part of the Omega Nebula

CEN 16, also known as ALS 19608, is a O-type main sequence star in the constellation of Sagittarius. The star is located in the center of the Omega Nebula, roughly 4600±100 light years (or 1420±50 parsecs) away. The star has an apparent visual magnitude of 13.69. The star was discovered on 25 March 1976 in a survey of stars in the Omega Nebula.

== Characteristics ==
CEN 16 is a massive, young late O-type main sequence star in the Omega Nebula. The star has a spectral type of O8.5V found using data from the Very Large Telescope, meaning it is still in the main-sequence phase. The star is also believed to very massive with a spectroscopic-derived stellar mass of 20.4+7.9
−7.3 M_{☉}. The star has a rotational velocity of 30+15
−25 km/s. The star is predicted to be extremely young with an age of only four million years. The star has an estimated radius of 10.9 R_{☉}. The diameter was found using a stellar luminosity of 125000±37000 L_{☉}, and an effective temperature of 34000±1000 K. (Note: Applying the Stefan–Boltzmann law with a nominal solar effective temperature of 5,772 K: $$\sqrt{\biggl(\frac{5,772}{34,000}\biggr)^4 \cdot {125,000}} = 10.9\ R_\odot$$.)

== Substellar companion ==
In November 2024, it was discovered that a potential brown dwarf companion may orbit CEN 16. The unconfirmed brown dwarf companion has a radius of 7.5 R_{J} and a mass of 70 M_{J}. The candidate brown dwarf companion has a calculated temperature of 2,884 K, and a luminosity of 0.033 L_{☉}. CEN 16 B has a semi-major axis of 883.5 astronomical units. CEN 16 B is notable because substellar objects orbiting O-type main sequence stars are exceptionally rare. According to the Extrasolar Planets Encyclopaedia, CEN 16 B is the only substellar object found around a O-type main sequence star.

The CEN 16 planetary system
Companion (in order from star)	Mass	Semimajor axis (AU)	Orbital period (years)	Eccentricity	Inclination (°)	Radius
B	70 M_{J}	883.5	—	—	—	7.5 R_{J}
