= VVV CL160 =

Globular cluster

Observation data
- Right ascension: 18h 06m 57s
- Declination: −20:00:40
- Distance: 22,170 ly (6800 pc)

Physical characteristics
- Radius: 1.43 ly
- Tidal radius: 189 ly
- Estimated age: 12 gyr
- Notable features: Has extreme proper motion

VVV CL160 is a nearby globular cluster located with in the galactic plane of the Milky Way galaxy. It is located 29 parsecs above the galactic plane and 4.2 kiloparsecs from the galactic center of the Milky Way. Its distance from the Sun is around 6800 parsecs and it is around 12 billion years old. The mass of VVV CL160 is around 5x10^4 solar masses. The cluster has a core radius of 1.43 light years but has a tidal radius of 189 light years. VVV CL160 has a significant population of RR Lyrae variable stars.

This globular cluster has an unusually high proper motion when compared to other globular clusters in the galactic plane. Its proper motion is similar to another known globular cluster in the constellation of Sagittarius known as NGC 6544 and the Hrid halo stream. This suggests that VVV CL160 and NGC 6544 may be associated with the Hrid halo stream making the total length of the stream much longer, giving it the potential to be a dwarf galaxy being accreted by the Milky Way galaxy.

== Discovery ==
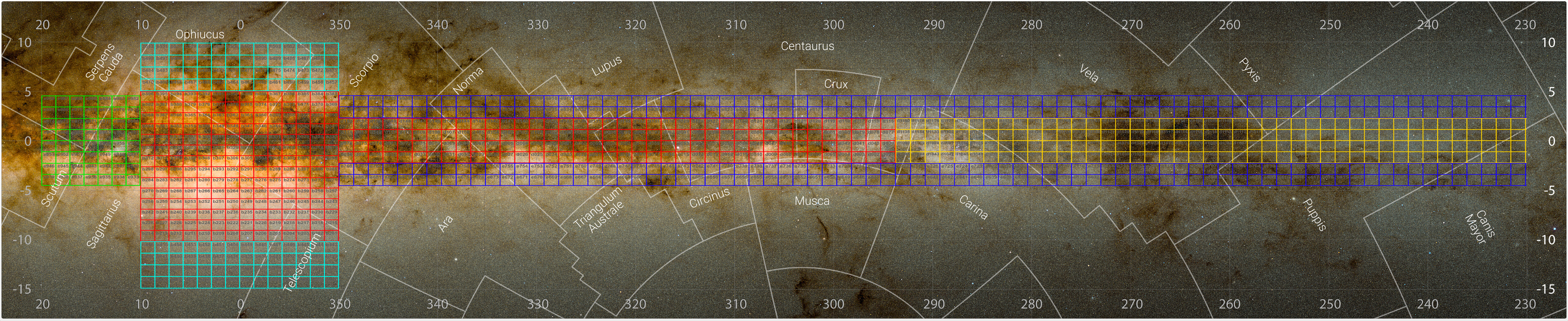
Area of the Milky Way mapped by the VVV and VVVX surveys

This globular cluster was detected by astronomers from the Andres Bello National University in Chile and elsewhere using the VISTA Variables in the Via Lactea (VVV) survey.
