= NGC 2467 =

Open cluster in the constellation Puppis

Emission nebula
- NGC 2467 and surrounding area, from European Southern Observatory

Observation data: J2000 epoch
- Right ascension: 07^{h} 52^{m} 24.22^{s}
- Declination: −26° 24′ 58.40″
- Distance: 4420 ly (1355 pc)
- Constellation: Puppis
- Designations: Cr 164, Gum 9, Sh 2-311, ESO 493-25

NGC 2467, nicknamed the "Skull and Crossbones Nebula", is a star-forming region whose appearance has occasionally also been likened to that of a colorful mandrill. It includes areas where large clouds of hydrogen gas incubate new stars. This region was one of the areas featured in the book Hubble's Universe: Greatest Discoveries and Latest Images by Terence Dickinson. (Note: An annotated image at Commons assists in understanding the following discussion.)

== Discussion ==
NGC 2467 had long been considered to be the nucleus of the Puppis I association. However, NGC 2467 does not represent a distinct open cluster; rather, it represents a superimposition of several stellar groups along the same approximate line of sight that have distinctly different distances and distinctly different radial velocities. One of these is a young and very distant group beyond Puppis OB2, while another, nearer group with later-type stars lies at a similar distance as Puppis OB1.

The region is dominated by a massive young star, HD 64315 (annotated in Commons, below and left of center), of spectral type O6. Two stellar clusters also exist in the area, Haffner 19 (H19, annotated) and Haffner 18 (H18, annotated). H19 is a compact cluster containing a Strömgren sphere which is ionized by a hot B0 V-type star. H18 contains a very young star, FM3060a (annotated), that has just come into existence and still surrounded by its birth cocoon of gas. The age of H19 is estimated to be 2 Myr, while the age H18 is somewhat controversial, some considering it to be as young as only 1 Myr. The field contains other early-type stars such as HD 64568 (annotated, upper right) whose relationship with the clusters is unclear.

The H II region of NGC 2467 has been the target of various investigations to elucidate the process of star formation. Unresolved questions include understanding the degree to which the stars already formed in such regions, especially the massive O or B stars, can affect the future formation of stars in the region: Do these pre-existing stars trigger the formation of others? One such investigation was conducted using the Spitzer Space Telescope, which discovered 45 young stellar objects (YSOs), or protostars, in the region during its "cold" mission, i.e. before its supply of liquid helium ran out. The YSOs are mostly along the edge of the HII region. The concentrated distribution of these objects spatially correlated with the ionization fronts provides evidence for triggered star formation. The newly forming ptotostars are concentrated in areas where the shock front driven in advance of the ionization front compresses the molecular gas.

It has been estimated that H19, H18, and the S311 nebula (in which lies HD 64315) are about 6.4 kiloparsecs (21,000 light-years), 5.9 kpc (19,000 ly), and 6.3 kpc (21,000 ly) away, placing them in the Perseus Arm of the Milky Way. A significant discrepancy has existed between the distances to these features estimated kinematically versus distances estimated photometrically. Regardless of these discrepancies, H19 and H18 may be considered to be a binary cluster.

== Gallery ==
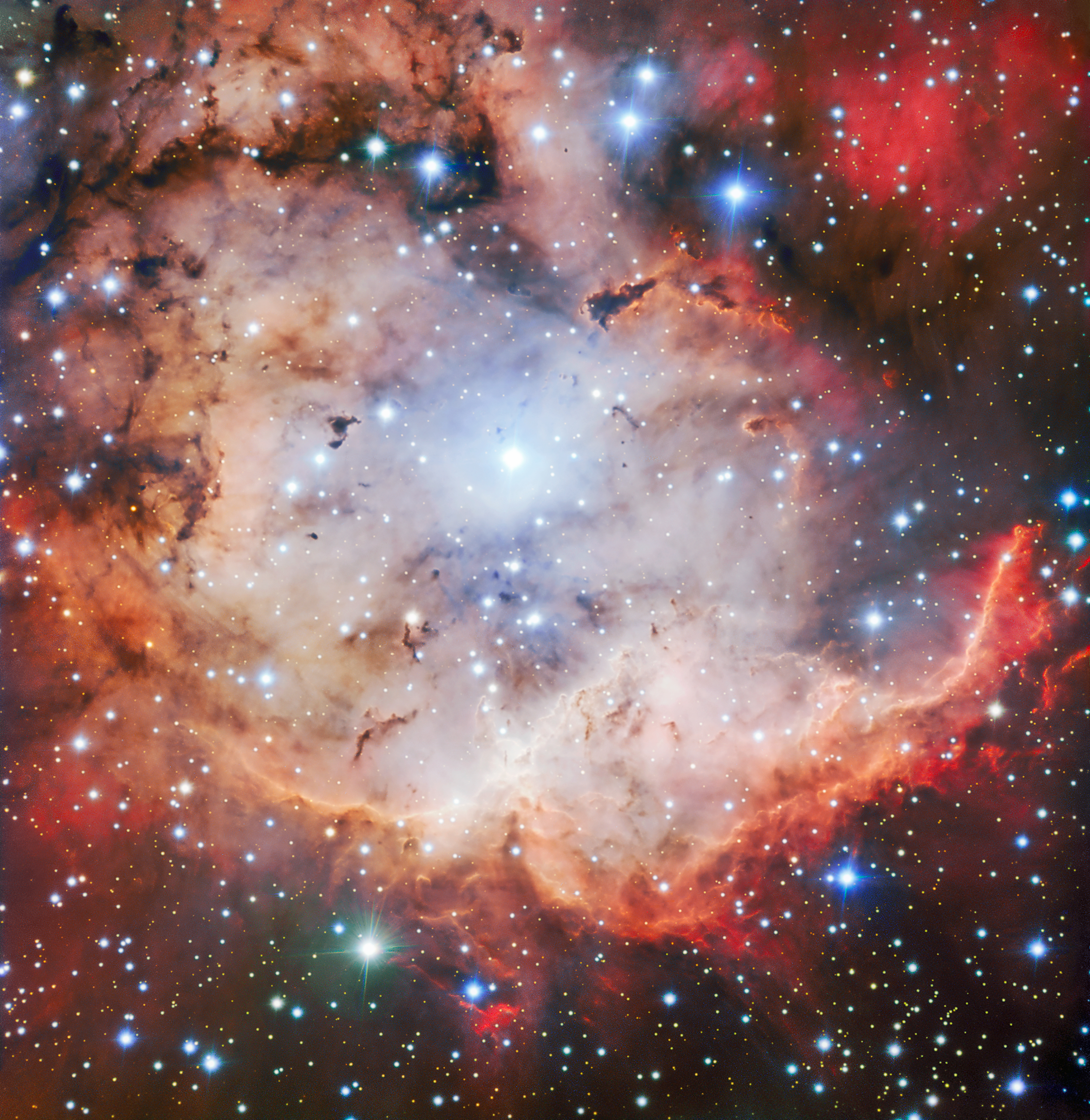
Active star-forming region of NGC 2467

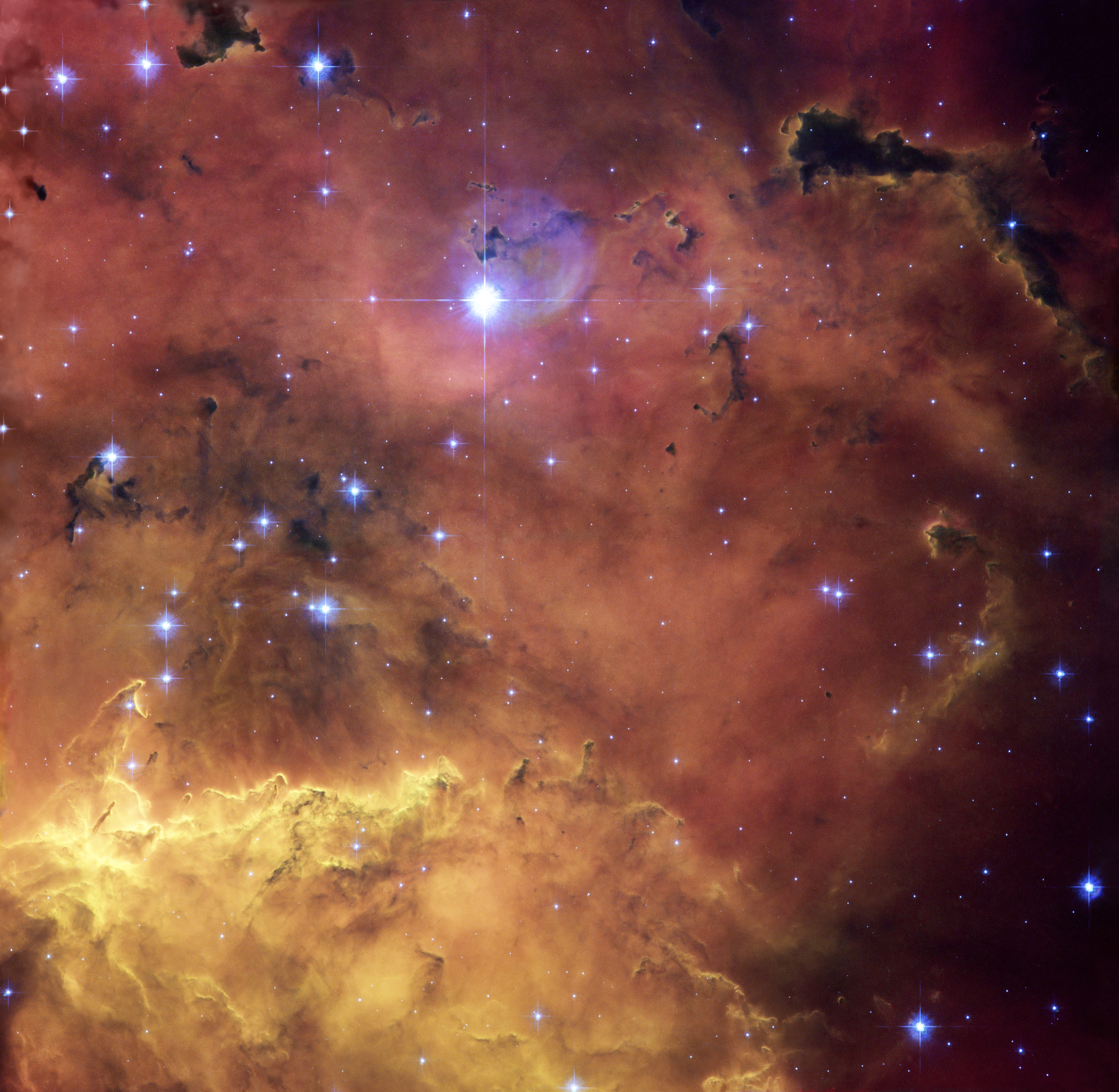
Hubble view of NGC 2467
