= 7 Sagittarii =

Star in the constellation Sagittarius

- Location of 7 Sagittarius (circled)

Observation data Epoch J2000 Equinox ICRS
- Constellation: Sagittarius
- Right ascension: 18^{h} 02^{m} 51.09872^{s}
- Declination: −24° 16′ 56.8825″
- Apparent magnitude (V): 5.37

Characteristics
- Spectral type: F2 II/III
- U−B color index: 0.25
- B−V color index: 0.51

Astrometry
Radial velocity (R_{v})	−11.2±1.0 km/s
Proper motion (μ)	RA: +1.22 mas/yr Dec.: −17.52 mas/yr
Parallax (π)	3.02±0.28 mas
Distance	1,100 ± 100 ly (330 ± 30 pc)
Absolute magnitude (M_{V})	−2.21

Details
Radius	18 R_{☉}
Luminosity	658.07 L_{☉}
Surface gravity (log g)	3.54±0.20 cgs
Temperature	6,800±200 K
Metallicity [Fe/H]	0.0 dex
Rotational velocity (v sin i)	35 km/s

Other designations
- 7 Sgr, CD−24° 13793, HD 164584, HIP 88380, HR 6724, SAO 186163

Database references
SIMBAD	data

7 Sagittarii is the brightest star in the region of the Lagoon Nebula, towards the right edge.

7 Sagittarii is a massive star in the southern zodiac constellation of Sagittarius which is located in the Lagoon Nebula (NGC 6530), although multiple sources have considered it a foreground star. It is a dim star but visible to the naked eye with an apparent visual magnitude of 5.37. The distance to this star can be determined from the annual parallax shift of 3.02±0.28 mas, yielding a value of roughly 1,100 light years. It is moving closer to the Sun with a heliocentric radial velocity of −11 km/s.

Gray and Garrison (1989) listed a stellar classification of F2 II/III for this star, suggesting it is a K-type star with a spectrum showing mixed traits of a giant/bright giant. Houk and Smith-Moore (1978) had a similar classification of F2/3 II/III. This may indicate it is not a member of NGC 6530, since it should not have evolved to this class from the O-type stars that still populate this cluster, and hasn't had time to evolve from a less massive cluster star.

It is a suspected chemically peculiar star. The spectral class from the calcium K line has been given as A8 while the class determined from other metallic lines was F4, making it an Am star. This peculiarity is now considered doubtful.

7 Sagittarii has an estimated 18 times the Sun's radius and is radiating 658 times the Sun's luminosity from its photosphere at an effective temperature of around 6,800 K.
