= NGC 6383 =

Star cluster in the constellation Scorpius

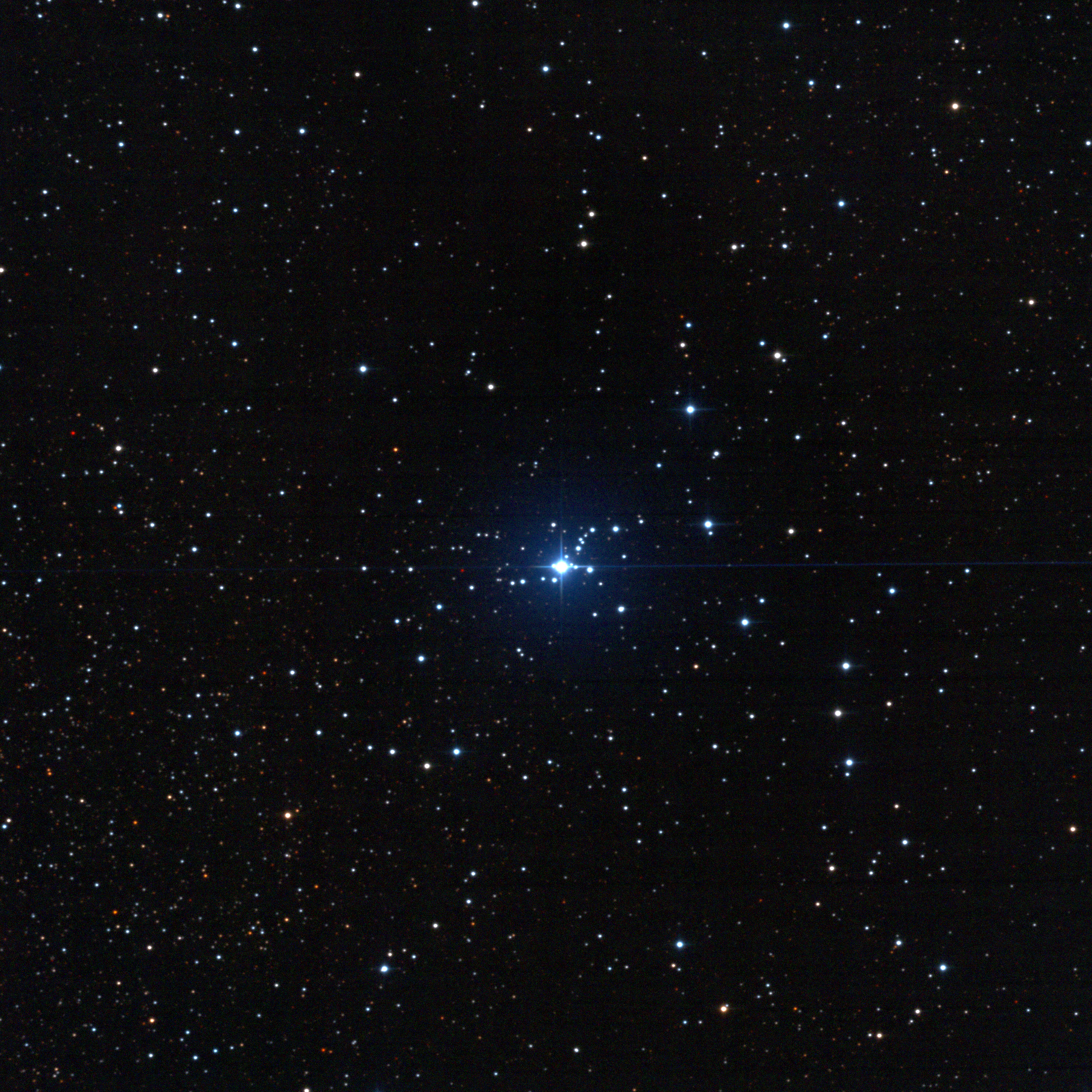

Observation data
- Right ascension: 17^{h} 34^{m} 41.5^{s}
- Declination: −32° 34′ 23″
- Distance: 3,540 ± 340 ly (1,086 ± 104 pc)
- Apparent dimensions (V): 20′

Physical characteristics
- Estimated age: 12.1+4.2 −3.1 Myr
- Other designations: NGC 6383, Cl VDBH 232

Associations
- Constellation: Scorpius

NGC 6383 is an open cluster of stars in the constellation of Scorpius. It was discovered by English astronomer John Herschel in 1847. In the New General Catalogue it was also identified as NGC 6374, most likely due to a clerical error. This is a large cluster of scattered stars that spans an angular diameter of 20′. The brightest component is the O-type binary star system designated HD 159176 (HR 4962). Against the glare of this sixth magnitude star, a handful of fainter members are visible with a pair of large binoculars.

The cluster NGC 6383 is located at a distance of approximately 3,540 light-years (1,086 pc) from the Sun. It forms part of the Milky Way galaxy's Carina–Sagittarius Arm in a star forming region identified as Sh 2-012, and lies in front of a dust absorption cloud. The cluster is likely part of the Sagittarius OB1 association, as are the clusters NGC 6530 and NGC 6531. This cluster, and in particular the ionizing radiation from the star HD 159176, form the H II region RCW 132, which span a crescent-shaped volume that has an angular size of 110′ × 80′.

This is a young cluster with age estimates ranging from 4 to 20 million years, and has not yet achieved dynamic relaxation. It has 254 members identified, with 53 forming young stellar objects, and 21 being hot, massive OB stars. 76 secondary X-ray sources have been detected, with most of them concentrated near the core. Newly-formed stars range in age from 1–6 million years old, indicating recent star formation activity. The cluster has a compact core radius of 1.94′±0.19′ and a tidal radius of 40.7′±14.4′.
