= HD 64568 =

Star in the constellation Puppis

- Location of HD 64568 (circled)

Observation data Epoch J2000.0 Equinox ICRS
- Constellation: Puppis
- Right ascension: 07^{h} 53^{m} 38.20519^{s}
- Declination: −26° 14′ 02.5981″
- Apparent magnitude (V): 9.39

Characteristics
- Evolutionary stage: Main-sequence star
- Spectral type: O3V((f*))z
- U−B color index: −0.86
- B−V color index: 0.11
- J−H color index: 0.001
- J−K color index: 0.008

Astrometry
Radial velocity (R_{v})	87.1±5.7 km/s
Proper motion (μ)	RA: −0.535 mas/yr Dec.: 4.115 mas/yr
Parallax (π)	0.2241±0.0177 mas
Distance	15,000 ± 1,000 ly (4,500 ± 400 pc)

Details
Mass	57 M_{☉}
Radius	14±2 R_{☉}
Luminosity	500000+290000 −180000 L_{☉}
Surface gravity (log g)	3.91±0.08 cgs
Temperature	44900±1700 K
Rotational velocity (v sin i)	≤117±13 km/s

Other designations
- CD−25° 5228, CPD−25° 3039, HD 64568, HIP 38548, SAO 174748, PPM 253404, TIC 128808726, TYC 6557-214-1, GSC 06557-00214, 2MASS J07533820-2614025, DENIS J075338.2-261402, Gaia DR2 5602033390154015744, NGC 2467 77

Database references
SIMBAD	data

HD 64568 is a massive solitary star in the southern constellation of Puppis. With an apparent magnitude of 9.39, it is too faint to be seen by the naked eye, but can barely be observed by binoculars, appearing as a blue-hued dot of light. It is located approximately 4,500 parsecs (15,000 light-years) distant according to Gaia EDR3 parallax measurements.

== Properties ==
Image of NGC 2467 from ESO. HD 64568 (circled) is in the top right.

HD 64568 belongs to an OB association named Puppis OB2, which is part of the star-forming region NGC 2467. It is one of the ionizing stars of the H II region Sh 2-311.

This is a very early O-type main-sequence star that is among the most massive stars, weighing 57 times the mass of the Sun, but has a comparatively modest radius of 14 R_{☉}. It radiates roughly 500,000 times the luminosity of the Sun from its photosphere at an effective temperature of 44,900 K (44,600 °C; 80,400 °F). It is losing mass to stellar winds, but the rate at which this occurs is highly uncertain, with two models yielding values of 5.6±5.0×10^{−7} M_{☉}/yr and 2.3×10^{−6} M_{☉}/yr.

In 1982, it was given the spectral type O3V((f*)), becoming the first object of its kind. The ((f*)) suffix signifies the presence of weak N IV (N^{3+}) 4058 Å emission line and N V (N^{4+}) absorption lines, the lack of any N III (N^{2+}) emission, along with the strong He II (He^{+}) 4686 Å absorption. Radial velocity variations were discovered in 1986, which, at the time, was theorized to be either caused by an unseen binary companion or atmospheric instabilities seen in massive stars. The latter theory was confirmed to be true by Markova (2011) as there was no evidence for a secondary object, and the variations are now thought to be the result of stellar pulsations and/or stellar wind variations. The same study also corroborated the O3V((f*)) classification. Sota et al. (2014) updated the spectral type to O3V((f*))z, with the added "z" suffix to indicate that the 4686 Å helium line is abnormally strong.
