= NGC 6530 =

Open cluster in the constellation Sagittarius

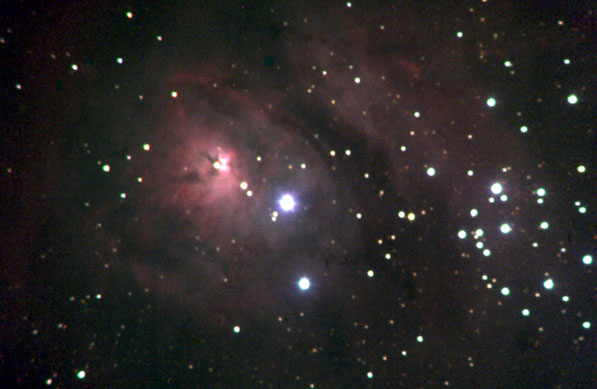
- NGC 6530 (right) and the Lagoon Nebula

Observation data (J2000 epoch)
- Right ascension: 18^{h} 04^{m} 31.0^{s}
- Declination: −24° 21′ 30″
- Distance: 4,360 ly (1,336+76 −68 pc); 4,320 ly (1,325 pc)
- Apparent magnitude (V): 4.6
- Apparent dimensions (V): 14.0′

Physical characteristics
- Radius: 7 ly
- Estimated age: 4–6 Myr
- H II region
- Other designations: Cr 362

Associations
- Constellation: Sagittarius

NGC 6530 is a young open cluster of stars in the southern constellation of Sagittarius, located some 4,300 light years from the Sun. It exists within the H II region known as the Lagoon Nebula, or Messier 8, and spans an angular diameter of 14.0′. The nebulosity was first discovered by G. B. Hodierna prior to 1654, then re-discovered by J. Flamsteed circa 1680. It was P. Loys who classified it as a cluster in 1746, as he could only resolve stars. The following year, G. Le Gentil determined it was both a nebula and a cluster.

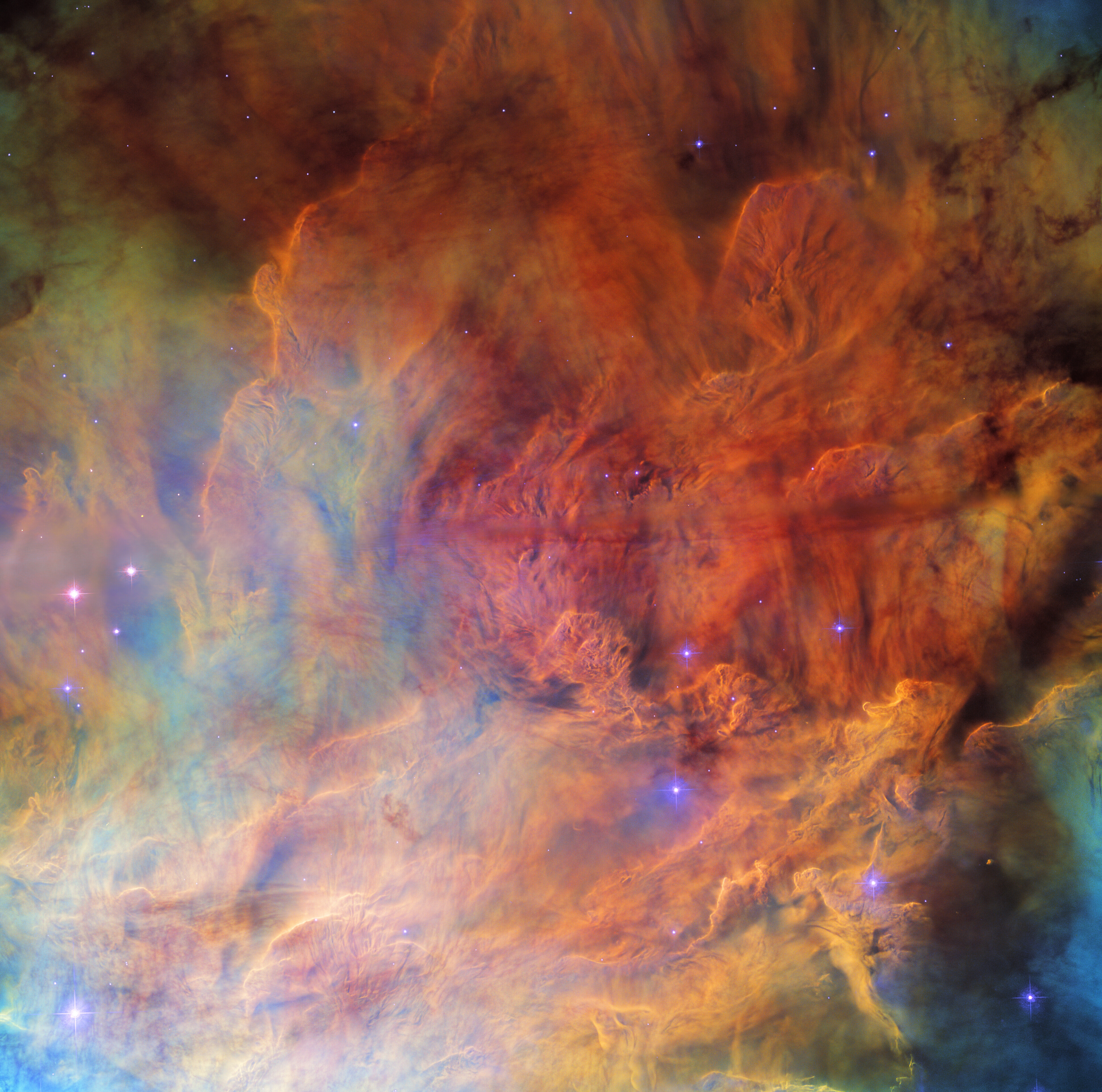
Portion of NGC 6530 seen by Hubble

The brightest six members of the cluster are visible in 10×50 binoculars at magnitudes 6.9 and fainter, while fifteen evenly distributed stars are visible with a 25×100 pair. More than two dozen stars are visible in an amateur telescope. The average extinction A_{V} due to interstellar dust along the line of sight from the Earth is 1.20±0.24, with a color excess E(B−V) of 0.38±0.07.

In total, 3,675 stars in the field of NGC 6530 have been catalogued as candidate members, with the likely members being 2,728. As of 2019, 652 stars have been confirmed as members: 333 of these are classical T Tauri-type variable stars showing a near infrared emission excess, while the remainder are weak T Tauri stars showing a photospheric excess. Candidate stars appear in two main groups at the cluster core and the Sagittarius "Hourglass nebula", with other smaller concentrations. Two such minor concentrations are associated with the stars 7 Sgr and HD 164536.

Age estimates for the members shows a spread in values that suggests more than one burst of star formation. Initial star formation began up to 15 million years ago, but the bulk formed in the last 1–2 million years near the cluster center. Astrometric data suggests the parent molecular cloud collided with the galactic plane some four million years ago, which may have triggered the star formation. The dispersion of velocities for a sample of stars in the cluster suggests it may be gravitationally unbound and there is evidence the star population is expanding, particularly to the north and south.
