= HD 159176 =

Variable star in the constellation Scorpius

- Location of HD 159176 (circled in red)

Observation data Epoch J2000.0 Equinox ICRS
- Constellation: Scorpius
- Right ascension: 17^{h} 34^{m} 42.49213^{s}
- Declination: −32° 34′ 53.9955″
- Apparent magnitude (V): 5.71 - 5.79

Characteristics
- Spectral type: O6.5V + O7V
- U−B color index: −0.86
- B−V color index: +0.04
- Variable type: Rotating ellipsoidal

Astrometry
Proper motion (μ)	RA: 2.621±0.083 mas/yr Dec.: −0.798±0.058 mas/yr
Parallax (π)	1.1666±0.0707 mas
Distance	2,800 ± 200 ly (860 ± 50 pc)
Absolute magnitude (M_{V})	−4.53

Orbit
Period (P)	3.366767 d
Eccentricity (e)	0.0
Periastron epoch (T)	2448885.420±0.003
Semi-amplitude (K_{1}) (primary)	215.7±1.4 km/s
Semi-amplitude (K_{2}) (secondary)	218.1±1.5 km/s

Details

Primary
Mass	46.4+14.3 −9.5 M_{☉}
Luminosity	10^{5.50±0.10} L_{☉}
Temperature	38,000 K

Secondary
Mass	44.2+13.6 −9.1 M_{☉}
Luminosity	10^{5.41±0.10} L_{☉}
Temperature	36,750 K

Other designations
- V1036 Scorpii, HIP 86011, HR 6535, SAO 208977, Boss 4444

Database references
SIMBAD	data

HD 159176, also known as Boss 4444 and V1036 Scorpii, is a variable star about 2,800 light years from the Earth, in the constellation Scorpius. It is a 5th magnitude star, so it should be visible to the naked eye of an observer far from city lights. HD 159176 is the brightest star in the young open cluster NGC 6383. It is a binary star composed of two nearly identical O stars in a circular orbit.

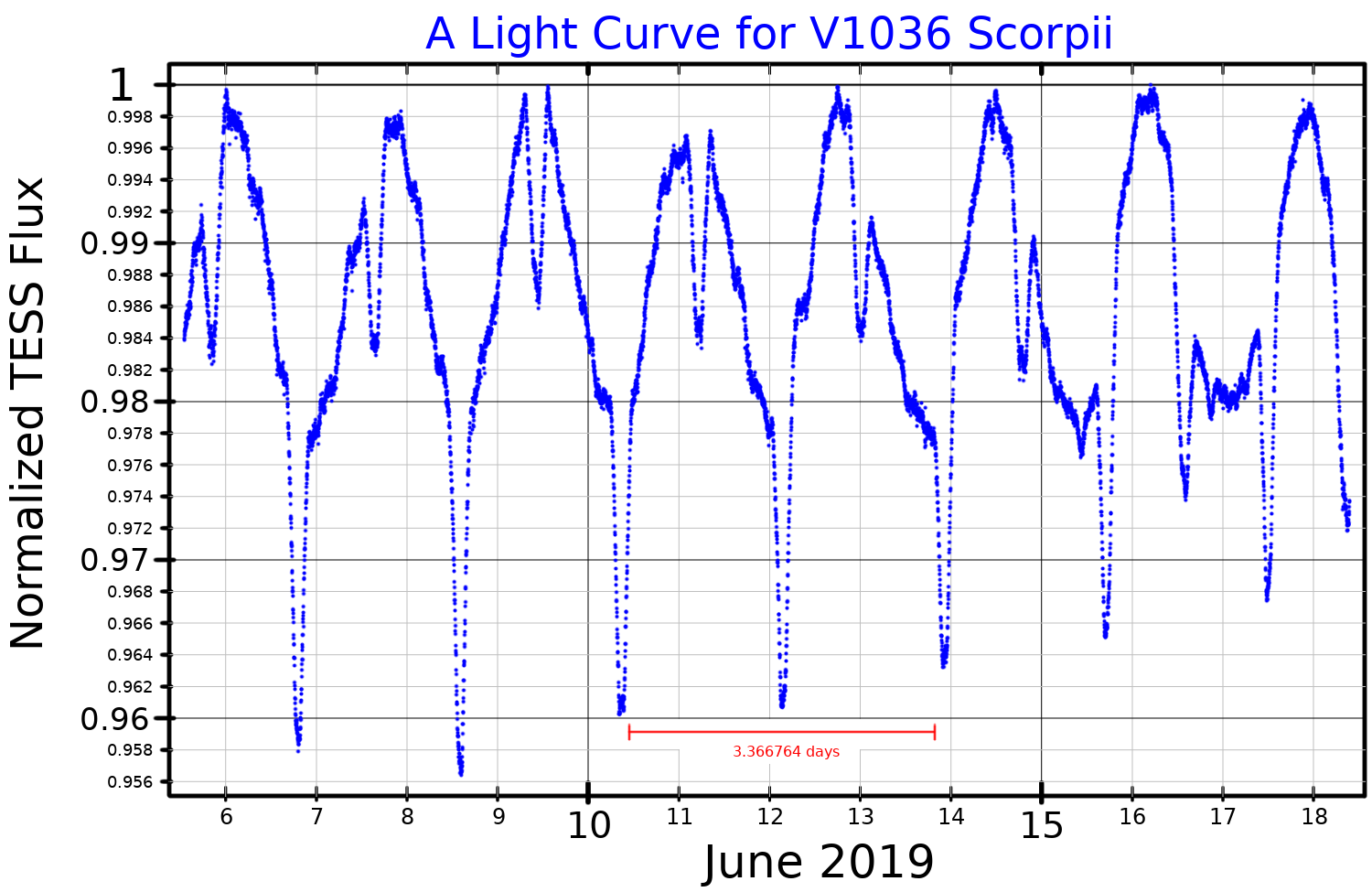
A light curve for V1036 Scorpii, plotted from TESS data. The orbital period is marked in red.

In 1930, Robert Trumpler discovered that HD 159176 is a spectroscopic binary. He noted that the two stars have very nearly the same brightness and spectral type. In addition, he was observing at the Lick Observatory, so the far southern declination of the star meant it could only be observed near transit. Those three things together prevented him from unambiguously measuring the orbital period. The first full set of orbital elements, including the 3.3664±0.0003 day period, was derived by Peter Conti et al. in 1975. Also in 1975, photometric observations by J. C. Thomas showed that HD 159176 is a rotating ellipsoidal variable. The star's spectra exhibit the Struve–Sahade effect. HD 159176 was given the variable star designation V1036 Scorpii, in 1997.

Although HD 159176 was long considered to be a non-eclipsing binary, data from the Transiting Exoplanet Survey Satellite does show eclipses.

HD 159176 has an X-ray luminosity far higher than would be expected from two isolated O stars. The excess X-rays may arise from interacting stellar winds.
