= Lagoon Nebula =

Emission nebula in Sagittarius

Emission nebula
- H II region
- M8, the Lagoon Nebula

Observation data: J2000 epoch
- Right ascension: 18^{h} 03^{m} 37^{s}
- Declination: −24° 23′ 12″
- Distance: 4,100 ly (1,250 pc)
- Apparent magnitude (V): 4.6
- Apparent dimensions (V): 90 × 40 arcmins
- Constellation: Sagittarius

Physical characteristics
- Radius: 55 × 20 ly
- Designations: Sharpless 25, RCW 146, Gum 72; M8 contains: NGC 6523, NGC 6530, Hourglass nebula

The Lagoon Nebula (catalogued as Messier 8 or M8, NGC 6523, Sharpless 25, RCW 146, and Gum 72) is a giant emission nebula with an H II region located in the constellation Sagittarius. Discovered by Giovanni Hodierna in 1654, it is one of only two star-forming nebulae faintly visible to the naked eye from mid-northern latitudes (the other being the Orion Nebula).

== Characteristics ==
Located approximately 4,000–6,000 light-years from Earth, the nebula spans 110 by 50 light-years (appearing as 90' by 40' in Earth's sky). While appearing pink in long-exposure photographs, it typically appears gray when viewed through binoculars or telescopes due to the human eye's limited color sensitivity in low-light conditions. The nebula contains the young open cluster NGC 6530 within its structure.

The Lagoon Nebula features several distinctive structures, including:

- Multiple Bok globules cataloged by E. E. Barnard (B88, B89, and B296)
- A funnel-shaped structure formed by ultraviolet radiation from a hot O-type star
- The centrally-located Hourglass Nebula (named by John Herschel), distinct from the Engraved Hourglass Nebula in Musca

Observations in 2006 revealed four Herbig–Haro objects within the Hourglass structure, providing direct evidence of ongoing star formation through accretion processes.

== Gallery ==
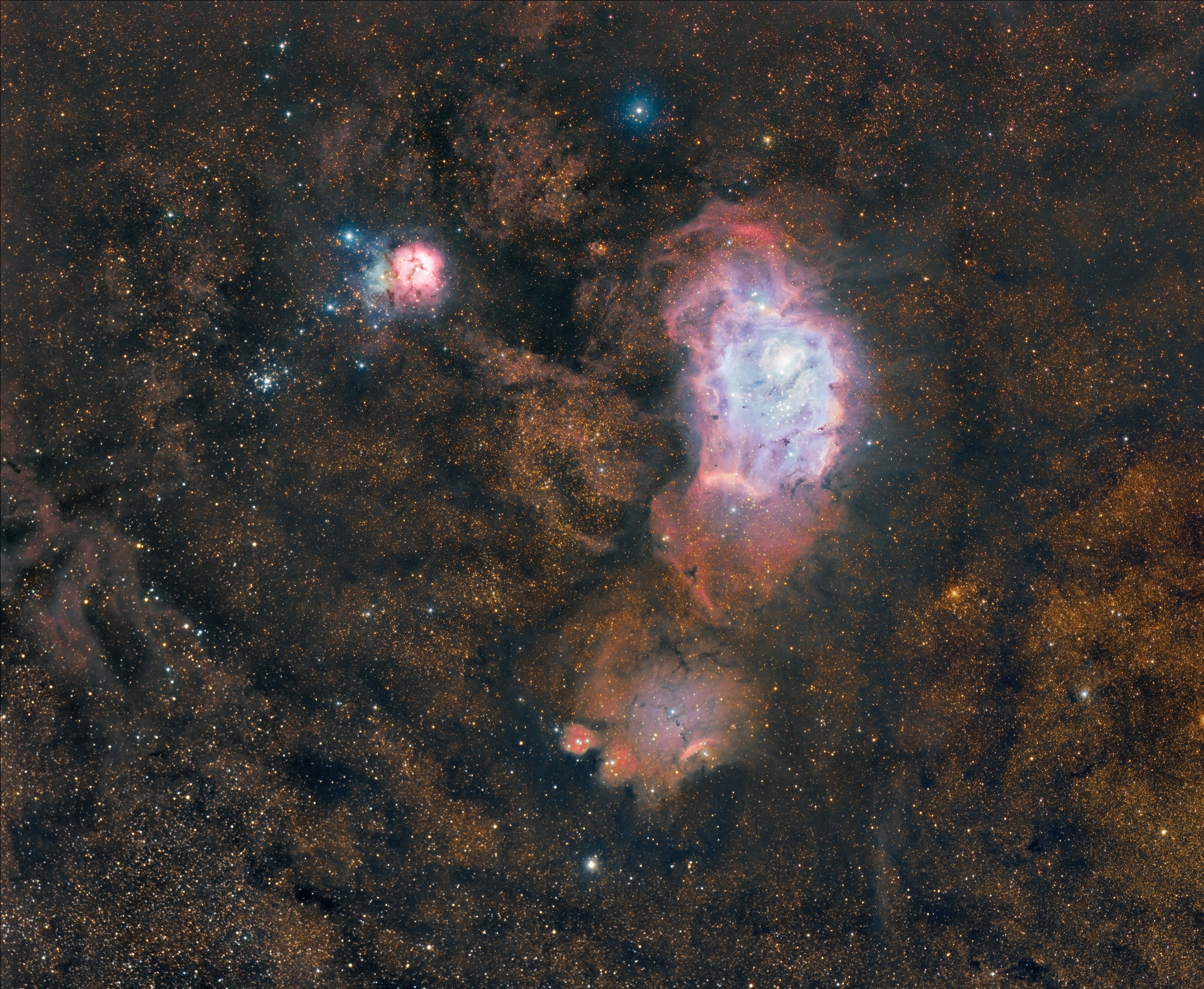
Lagoon Nebula in HaRGB

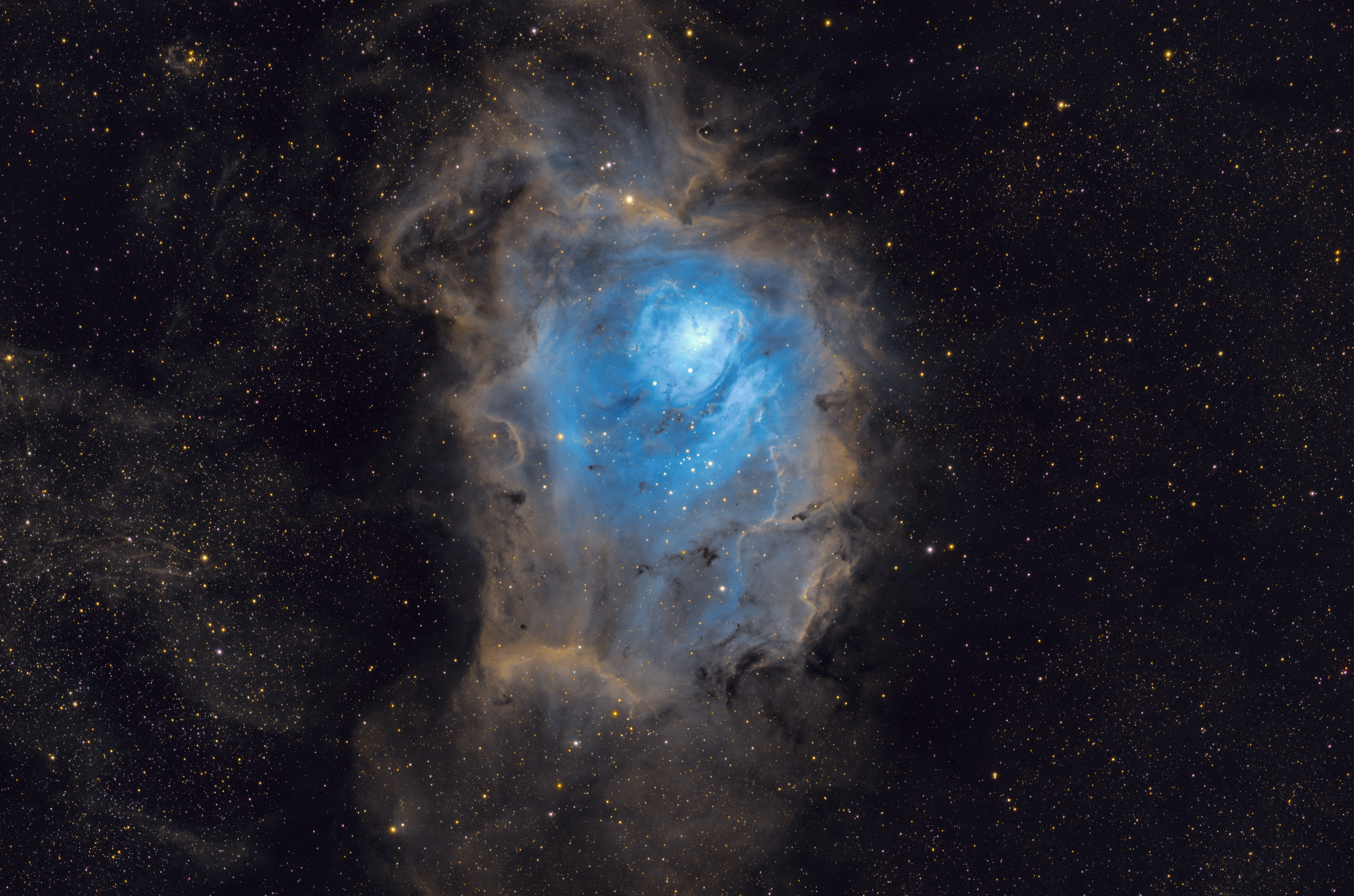
Lagoon Nebula in SHO by amateur astronomer Buzz Jumaah from Auckland, New Zealand

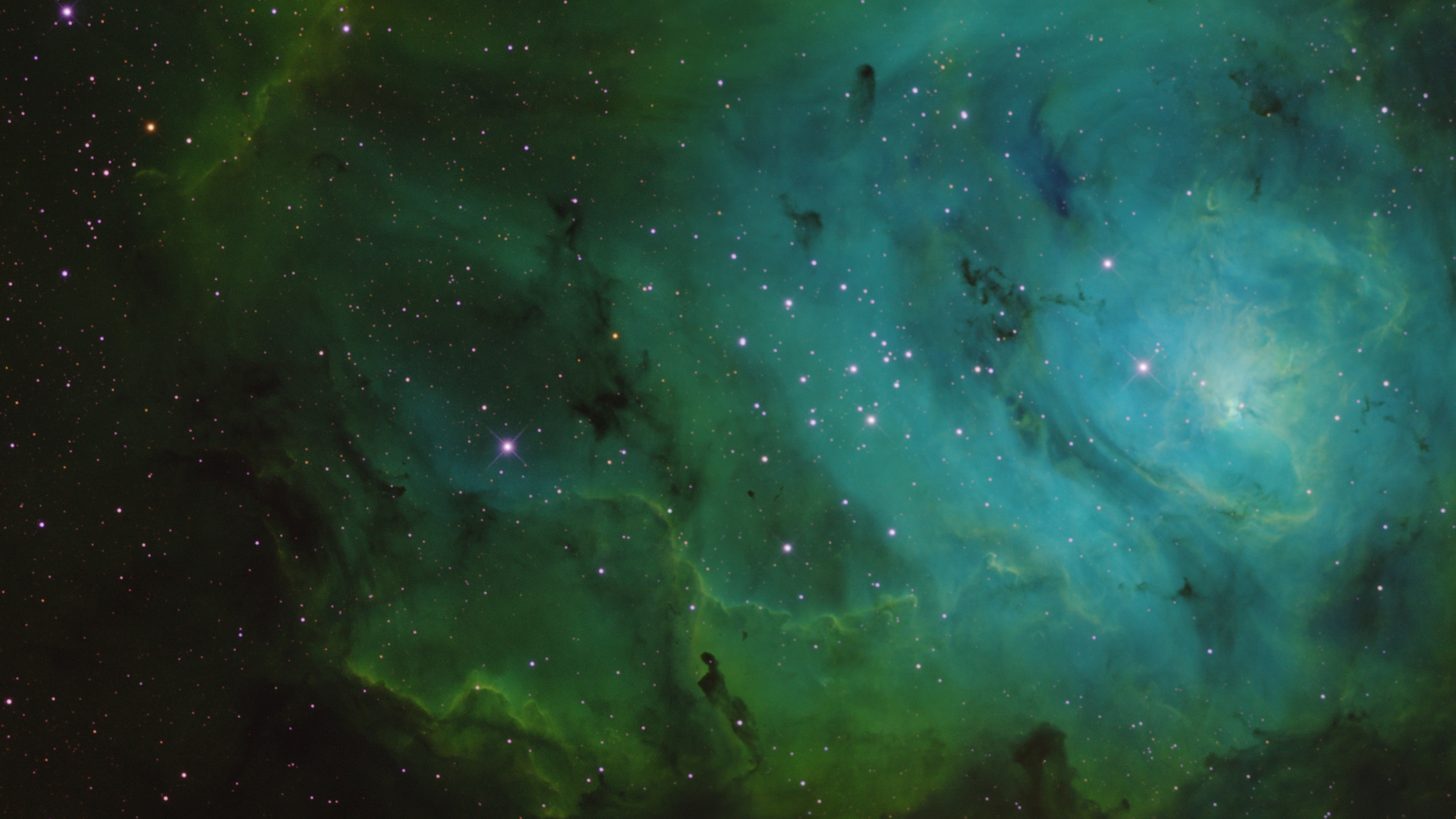
False color (SHO without green reduction) close up from Madison, Wisconsin, USA

The Lagoon Nebula as imaged by the Vera C. Rubin Observatory in very high-resolution, taken on May 28, 2025 (Note: The bluish-pink nebula on the upper right is the Trifid Nebula.)

== See also ==
- List of Messier objects
- Lists of nebulae
