= Heiheionakeiki =

Constellation

Heiheionakeiki is a Polynesian constellation which mariners used to navigate to Tahiti. It contains the seven main stars of the western constellation Orion:

- Rigel
- Betelgeuse
- Alnilam
- Alnitak
- Mintaka
- Bellatrix
- Saiph

As all of Hawaiian Airlines’s Airbus A330-200s are named for a constellation or star used by the ancient Polynesians for celestial navigation when making their voyages across the Pacific to Hawaii, the airline has named its seventh Airbus A330-200 (N386HA) aircraft after the constellation.
