= 32 Orionis =

Triple star system in the constellation Orion

- Location of 32 Orionis (circled)

Observation data Epoch J2000 Equinox ICRS
- Constellation: Orion
- Right ascension: 05^{h} 30^{m} 47.05091^{s}
- Declination: +05° 56′ 53.2925″
- Apparent magnitude (V): 4.20 (4.43 + 5.80)

Characteristics
- Spectral type: B5V + ? + B7V
- U−B color index: –0.56
- B−V color index: –0.13

Astrometry
Radial velocity (R_{v})	+18.60 km/s
Proper motion (μ)	RA: +5.10 mas/yr Dec.: –33.30 mas/yr
Parallax (π)	10.77±0.64 mas
Distance	300 ± 20 ly (93 ± 6 pc)
Absolute magnitude (M_{V})	–0.63

Details

32 Ori A
Mass	5.0 M_{☉}
Radius	2.9 R_{☉}
Luminosity	388 L_{☉}
Surface gravity (log g)	4.40 cgs
Temperature	16,020 K
Rotational velocity (v sin i)	169 km/s
Age	65 Myr

Other designations
- A Ori, 32 Ori, NSV 14617, BD+05°939, GC 6813, HD 36267, HIP 25813, HR 1839, SAO 112849, CCDM J05308+0557AB, WDS J05308+0557AB

Database references
SIMBAD	data

32 Orionis is a triple star system in the equatorial constellation of Orion. It has the Bayer designation A Orionis, while 32 Orionis is the Flamsteed designation. This system is visible to the naked eye as a faint point of light with a combined apparent visual magnitude of 4.20. It is located approximately 303 light-years away from the Sun based on parallax, and is drifting further away with a radial velocity of +18.6 km/s.

The system is a member of the eponymous 32 Orionis group, a young, nearby association of 46 co-moving stars first discovered in 2007. Research in 2015 suggested that Bellatrix is a probable member of the group due to its distance and position in the sky and suggested it be called the Bellatrix Cluster, although further research in 2017 called Bellatrix's membership into question due to its proper motion deviating significantly from the group.

The primary component of this system is a B-type main-sequence star with a stellar classification of B5V and a magnitude around 4.43. This is actually a spectroscopic binary with an orbital period of 3.964 days and eccentricity of 0.38. The unseen companion has an estimated mass of 0.6 times that of the Sun. Component B, at an angular separation of 1.08″ from the primary, is a class B7V star with a magnitude of 5.8, orbiting with the primary at a period of 614 years and eccentricity 0.22.
