= Ensis (disambiguation) =

Ensis is a genus of mollusks.

Ensis may also refer to:

- The Ensis, a mythical sword represented by the star Eta Orionis in the constellation Orion
- Ensis ensis
