= Omicron Orionis =

Omicron Orionis refers to two distinct star systems in the constellation Orion:

- ο^{1} Orionis (4 Orionis), an M3S semiregular variable star
- ο^{2} Orionis (9 Orionis), a K2 giant star

All of them were member of asterism 參旗 (Sān Qí), Banner of Three Stars, Net mansion.

== See also ==
o Orionis (22 Orionis)
