= Saiph =

Blue supergiant in the constellation of Orion

- Location of Saiph (circled)

Observation data Epoch J2000 Equinox ICRS
- Constellation: Orion
- Right ascension: 05^{h} 47^{m} 45.38884^{s}
- Declination: −09° 40′ 10.5777″
- Apparent magnitude (V): 2.09

Characteristics
- Evolutionary stage: Blue supergiant
- Spectral type: B0.5 Ia
- U−B color index: −1.02
- B−V color index: −0.18
- Variable type: Suspected

Astrometry
Radial velocity (R_{v})	+20.5 km/s
Proper motion (μ)	RA: +1.46 mas/yr Dec.: −1.28 mas/yr
Parallax (π)	5.04±0.22 mas
Distance	650 ± 30 ly (198 ± 9 pc)
Absolute magnitude (M_{V})	−6.1

Details
Mass	15.5±1.25 or 21.1 M_{☉}
Radius	13–14 R_{☉}
Luminosity	60,300+10,500 −9,000 L_{☉}
Surface gravity (log g)	2.70±0.05 cgs
Temperature	25,700±260 K
Rotational velocity (v sin i)	83 km/s
Age	11.1±0.5 or 5.6 Myr

Other designations
- κ Orionis, 53 Orionis, 141 G. Orionis, BD−09 1235, FK5 220, HD 38771, HIP 27366, HR 2004, SAO 132542.

Database references
SIMBAD	data

Saiph /ˈseɪf/, designation Kappa Orionis (κ Orionis, abbreviated Kappa Ori, κ Ori) and 53 Orionis (53 Ori), is a blue supergiant star and the sixth-brightest star in the constellation of Orion. Of the four bright stars that compose Orion's main quadrangle, it is the star at the south-eastern corner. A northern-hemisphere observer facing south would see it at the lower left of Orion, and a southern-hemisphere observer facing north would see it at the upper right. Parallax measurements yield an estimated distance of 650 light-years (200 parsecs) from the Sun. It is smaller, less luminous but hotter at its surface than Rigel with an apparent visual magnitude of 2.1. The luminosity of this star changes slightly, varying by 0.04 magnitudes.

== Nomenclature ==
Kappa Orionis is the star's Bayer designation and 53 Orionis its Flamsteed designation. The traditional name Saiph is from the Arabic saif al-jabbar (سیف الجبّار), lit. 'saif of the giant'. This name was originally applied to Eta Orionis. In 2016, the International Astronomical Union organized a Working Group on Star Names (WGSN) to catalog and standardize proper names for stars. The WGSN's first bulletin of July 2016 included a table of the first two batches of names approved by the WGSN, which included Saiph for this star. It is now so entered in the IAU Catalog of Star Names.

In the 17th-century catalogue of stars in the Calendarium of Al Achsasi al Mouakket, this star was designated Rekbah al Jauza al Yemeniat, which was translated into Latin as Genu Dextrum Gigantis "right knee of the giant".

== Properties ==
Saiph is a supergiant with a stellar classification of B0.5 Ia. The luminosity class 'Ia' represents a bright supergiant star that has exhausted the supply of hydrogen at its core and evolved away from the main sequence. Saiph has a strong stellar wind and is losing mass at the rate of 9.0 × 10^{−7} times the mass of the Sun per year, or the equivalent of the Sun's mass every 1.1 million years. Using a combination of parallax as determined by Hipparcos and the spectrum yields a mass 15.50 ± 1.25 times and luminosity 56,881 times that of the Sun. Analysis of the spectra and age of the members of the Orion OB1 association yields a mass 28 times that of the Sun (from an original mass 31.8 times that of the Sun) and an age of 6.2 million years. An analysis of the star's spectral energy distribution using the Hipparcos distance give a luminosity of 60,000 L_{☉} and a radius of 13 R_{☉}. Large stars such as Saiph (and many other stars in Orion) are destined to collapse on themselves and explode as supernovae.

== In non-Western astronomy and culture ==
In Chinese, 參宿 (Shēn Xiù), meaning Three Stars (asterism), refers to an asterism consisting of Saiph, Alnitak, Alnilam, Mintaka, Betelgeuse, Bellatrix and Rigel. Consequently, the Chinese name for Saiph is 參宿六 (Shēn Xiù Liù, English: the Sixth Star of Three Stars).

The Wardaman people of northern Australia regard Saiph as the Guman digging stick, used to make a canyon by Black-headed Python.
