= Mu Orionis =

Quadruple star system in the constellation Orion

μ Orionis
- Location of μ Ori (circled)

Observation data Epoch J2000 Equinox ICRS
- Constellation: Orion
- μ Ori A
- Right ascension: 06^{h} 02^{m} 22.997^{s}
- Declination: +09° 38′ 50.24″
- Apparent magnitude (V): 4.30
- μ Ori B
- Right ascension: 06^{h} 02^{m} 23.009^{s}
- Declination: +09° 38′ 50.52″
- Apparent magnitude (V): 6.27

Characteristics

μ Ori A
- Spectral type: A1 Vm
- U−B color index: +0.11
- B−V color index: +0.14

μ Ori B
- Spectral type: F2 V
- U−B color index: +0.00
- B−V color index: +0.43

Astrometry
Radial velocity (R_{v})	0.00 km/s
Proper motion (μ)	RA: 10.43 mas/yr Dec.: −39.09 mas/yr
Parallax (π)	21.69±0.13 mas
Distance	150.4 ± 0.9 ly (46.1 ± 0.3 pc)
Absolute magnitude (M_{V})	Aa: 0.93; Ba: 3.53; Bb: 3.53

Orbit
Primary	μ Ori A
Name	μ Ori B
Period (P)	6,813.8±1.2 d
Semi-major axis (a)	0.2737±0.0021" (12.620±0.057 AU)
Eccentricity (e)	0.7410±0.0011
Inclination (i)	96.028±0.028°

Orbit
Primary	μ Ori Aa
Name	μ Ori Ab
Period (P)	4.4475849 days
Semi-major axis (a)	0.001661±0.000013" (0.07659±0.00058 AU)
Eccentricity (e)	0.0037±0.0014
Inclination (i)	47.1±9.0°
Semi-amplitude (K_{1}) (primary)	1.03±0.26 km/s
Semi-amplitude (K_{2}) (secondary)	> 4.58 km/s

Orbit
Primary	μ Ori Ba
Name	μ Ori Bb
Period (P)	4.7835349 days
Semi-major axis (a)	0.001688±0.000013" (0.07659±0.00036 AU)
Eccentricity (e)	0.0016±0.0014
Inclination (i)	110.71±0.73°
Semi-amplitude (K_{1}) (primary)	1.72±0.26 km/s
Semi-amplitude (K_{2}) (secondary)	2.02±0.26 km/s

Details

μ Ori Aa
Mass	2.38 M_{☉}
Radius	2.85 R_{☉}
Luminosity	32.2 L_{☉}
Temperature	8,300 K
Rotational velocity (v sin i)	10 km/s
Age	282 Myr

μ Ori Ab
Mass	0.652 M_{☉}

μ Ori Ba
Mass	1.389 M_{☉}
Radius	1.33 R_{☉}
Luminosity	3.0 L_{☉}
Temperature	6,600 K

μ Ori Bb
Mass	1.356 M_{☉}
Radius	1.33 R_{☉}
Luminosity	3.0 L_{☉}
Temperature	6,600 K

Other designations
- Mu Orionis, Mu Ori, μ Orionis, μ Ori, 61 Orionis, 61 Ori, HR 2124, HD 40932, HIP 28614, BD+09°1064, ADS 4617, WDS J06024+0939, 2MASS J05351889-0516140

Database references
SIMBAD	data
- data2
- data3

μ Orionis (Latinised to Mu Orionis, abbreviated to μ Ori or Mu Ori) is a quadruple star system in the constellation Orion, similar to Mizar and Epsilon Lyrae with combined visual magnitude of 4.13. The four stars are known as Mu Orionis Aa, Mu Orionis Ab, Mu Orionis Ba, and Mu Orionis Bb. The A and B systems are several tenths of an arcsecond apart. The entire system is located approximately 150 light years from the Sun.

== Characteristics ==
Mu Orionis Aa is an A5V dwarf and metallic line star, of effective temperature 8,350 Kelvin, and apparent magnitude of +4.31. Mu Orionis Aa has 2.1 solar masses, and a radius of 2.9 R_{☉} and a luminosity 32 times that of the Sun.

Mu Orionis Ab is a G5V dwarf orbiting Aa at a distance of 0.077 AU, 0.2x the orbit of Mercury.

Mu Orionis Ba and Bb are F5V dwarfs with 1.4 solar masses and apparent magnitudes of 6.91. They are separated from each other by 0.078 AU.
