= Omicron2 Orionis =

Star in the constellation Orion

ο^{2} Orionis
- Location of ο^{2} Orionis (circled in red)

Observation data Epoch J2000.0 Equinox J2000.0 (ICRS)
- Constellation: Orion
- Right ascension: 04^{h} 56^{m} 22.27612^{s}
- Declination: +13° 30′ 52.0932″
- Apparent magnitude (V): 4.06

Characteristics
- Spectral type: K2 IIIb
- U−B color index: +1.14
- B−V color index: +1.17

Astrometry
Radial velocity (R_{v})	2.54±0.15 km/s
Proper motion (μ)	RA: −74.88 mas/yr Dec.: −44.33 mas/yr
Parallax (π)	17.54±0.21 mas
Distance	186 ± 2 ly (57.0 ± 0.7 pc)
Absolute magnitude (M_{V})	0.501

Details
Radius	15 R_{☉}
Luminosity	79 L_{☉}
Surface gravity (log g)	2.4 cgs
Temperature	4,498 K
Metallicity [Fe/H]	−0.26 dex
Rotational velocity (v sin i)	0.0 km/s
Age	5.42±2.38 Gyr

Other designations
- ο^{2} Ori, 9 Orionis, BD+13°740, HD 31421, HIP 22957, HR 1580, SAO 94218

Database references
SIMBAD	data

Omicron^{2} Orionis (ο^{2} Ori) is a solitary star in the constellation Orion. It has an apparent visual magnitude of 4.06, which is bright enough to be seen with the naked eye. Based upon an annual parallax shift of 17.54 mas, it is around 186 light years from the Sun. At that distance, the visual magnitude of the star is diminished by an interstellar absorption factor of 0.09 due to intervening dust.

This is a red clump giant star with a stellar classification of K2 IIIb. It is around 5.4 billion years old with a projected rotational velocity that is too small to be measured. The star has expanded to about 15 times the radius of the Sun and shines with 79 times the solar luminosity from its outer atmosphere at an effective temperature of 4,498 K. Omicron^{2} Orionis is most likely a member of the Milky Way's thin disk population.
