= Orion (constellation) =

Constellation straddling the celestial equator

- Constellation
- List of stars in Orion
- Abbreviation: Ori
- Genitive: Orionis
- Pronunciation: /ɒˈraɪ.ən/
- Symbolism: Orion, the Hunter
- Right ascension: 5^{h}
- Declination: +5°
- Quadrant: NQ1
- Area: 594 sq. deg. (26th)
- Main stars: 7
- Bayer/Flamsteed stars: 81
- Stars brighter than 3.00^{m}: 8
- Stars within 10.00 pc (32.62 ly): 8
- Brightest star: Rigel (β Ori) (0.12^{m})
- Nearest star: GJ 3379
- Messier objects: 3
- Meteor showers: Orionids; Chi Orionids
- Bordering constellations: Gemini; Taurus; Eridanus; Lepus; Monoceros
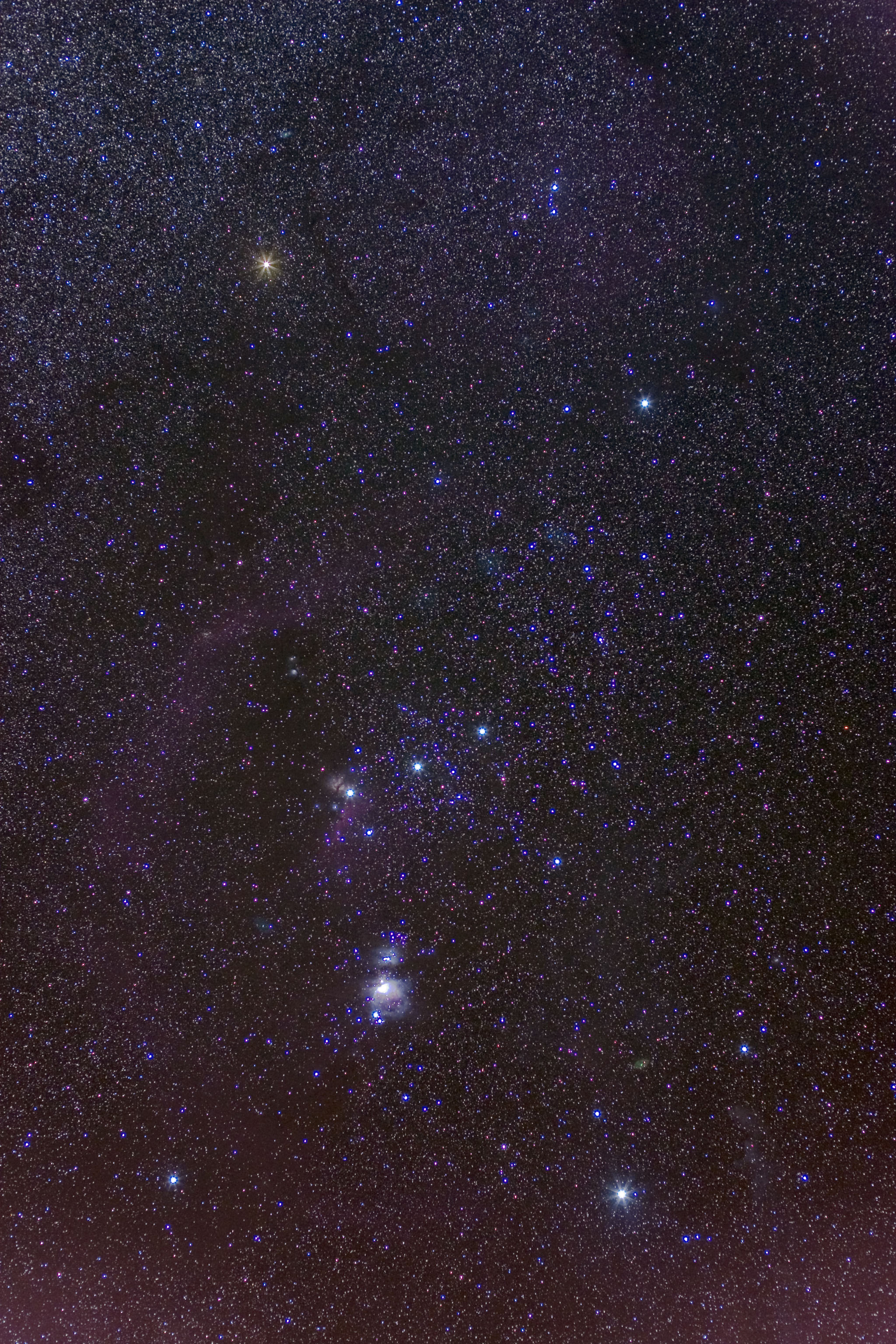
- Visible at latitudes between +80° and −68°. Best visible at 21:00 (9 p.m.) during the month of January. Click on to see large image.

Orion is a prominent set of stars visible during winter in the Northern Hemisphere. It is one of the 88 modern constellations; it was among the 48 constellations listed by the 2nd-century AD astronomer Ptolemy. It is named after a hunter in Greek mythology.

Orion is most prominent during winter evenings in the Northern Hemisphere, as are five other constellations that have stars in the Winter Hexagon asterism. Orion's two brightest stars, Rigel (β) and Betelgeuse (α), are both among the brightest stars in the night sky; both are supergiants and slightly variable. There are a further six stars brighter than magnitude 3.0, including three making the short straight line of the Orion's Belt asterism. Orion also hosts the radiant of the annual Orionids, the strongest meteor shower associated with Halley's Comet, and the Orion Nebula, one of the brightest nebulae in the sky.

== Characteristics ==
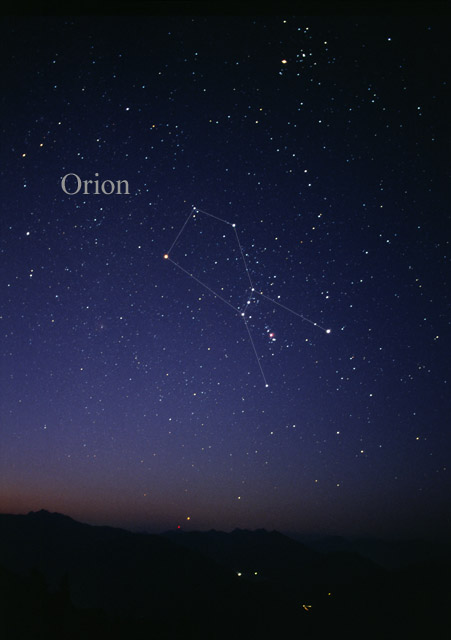
Orion indicated on a clear night

Orion is bordered by Taurus to the northwest, Eridanus to the southwest, Lepus to the south, Monoceros to the east, and Gemini to the northeast. Covering 594 square degrees, Orion ranks 26th of the 88 constellations in size. The constellation boundaries, as set by Belgian astronomer Eugène Delporte in 1930, are defined by a polygon of 26 sides. In the equatorial coordinate system, the right ascension coordinates of these borders lie between 04^{h} 43.3^{m} and 06^{h} 25.5^{m} , while the declination coordinates are between 22.87° and −10.97°. The constellation's three-letter abbreviation, as adopted by the International Astronomical Union in 1922, is "Ori".

Orion is most visible in the evening sky from January to April, winter in the Northern Hemisphere and summer in the Southern Hemisphere. It transits the Earth and Sun at the zenith in the tropics (less than about 8° from the equator).

From May to July, Orion is in the daytime sky and thus invisible at most latitudes. However, for much of Antarctica in the Southern Hemisphere's winter months, the Sun is below the horizon even at midday. Stars (but only the brightest stars of Orion) are then visible at twilight for a few hours around local noon, in the brightest section of the sky low in the North where the Sun is just below the horizon At the same time of day at the Amundsen–Scott South Pole Station, Rigel is only 8° above the horizon, and Orion's Belt sweeps just along it. In the Southern Hemisphere's summer months, when Orion is normally visible in the night sky, the constellation is not visible in Antarctica because the Sun does not set at that time of year south of the Antarctic Circle.

In countries close to the equator (e.g. Kenya, Indonesia, Colombia, and Ecuador), Orion appears overhead in December around midnight and continues to appear in the February evening sky.

=== Use to find other stars ===
Orion is very useful as an aid to locating other stars. By extending the line of Orion's Belt southeastward, Sirius (α CMa) can be found; northwestward, Aldebaran (α Tau). A line eastward across the two shoulders indicates the direction of Procyon (α CMi). A line from Rigel through Betelgeuse points to Castor and Pollux (α Gem and β Gem).

Additionally, Rigel is part of the Winter Hexagon asterism and Betelgeuse is part of the Winter Triangle. Sirius and Procyon, which may be located from Orion by following imaginary lines, are the other two points in the Triangle and are also both points in the Hexagon.

How to find other nearby stars

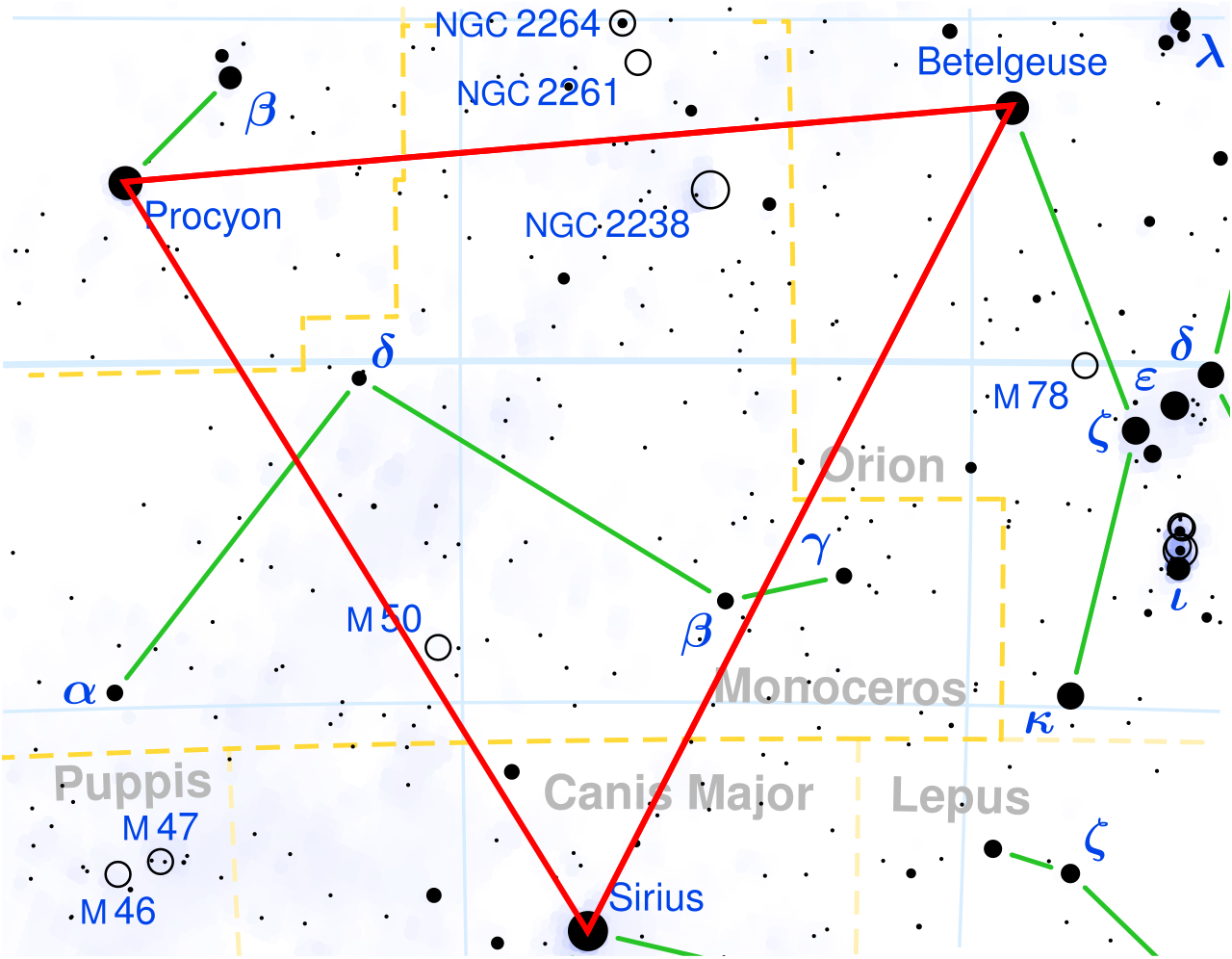
The Winter Triangle

== Features ==
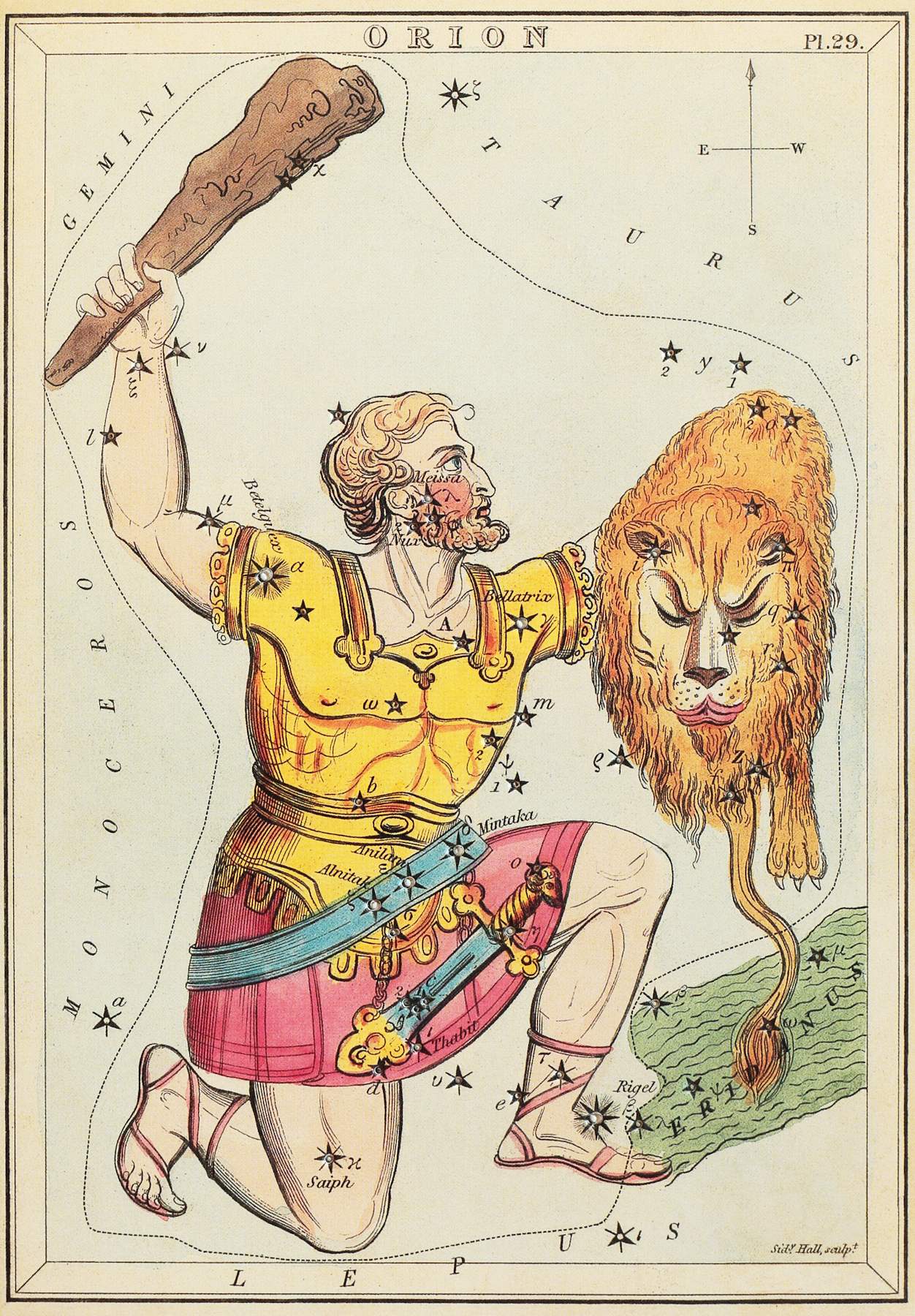
Orion as depicted in Urania's Mirror, a set of star chart cards published in London c. 1825

Orion's seven brightest stars form a distinctive hourglass-shaped asterism, or pattern, in the night sky. Four stars—Rigel, Betelgeuse, Bellatrix, and Saiph—form a large roughly rectangular shape, at the center of which lie the three stars of Orion's Belt—Alnitak, Alnilam, and Mintaka. His head is marked by an additional eighth star called Meissa, which is fairly bright to the observer. Descending from the Belt is a smaller line of three stars, Orion's Sword (the middle of which is in fact not a star but the Orion Nebula), also known as the hunter's sword.

Many of the stars are luminous hot blue supergiants, with the stars of the Belt and Sword forming the Orion OB1 association. Standing out by its red hue, Betelgeuse may nevertheless be a runaway member of the same group.

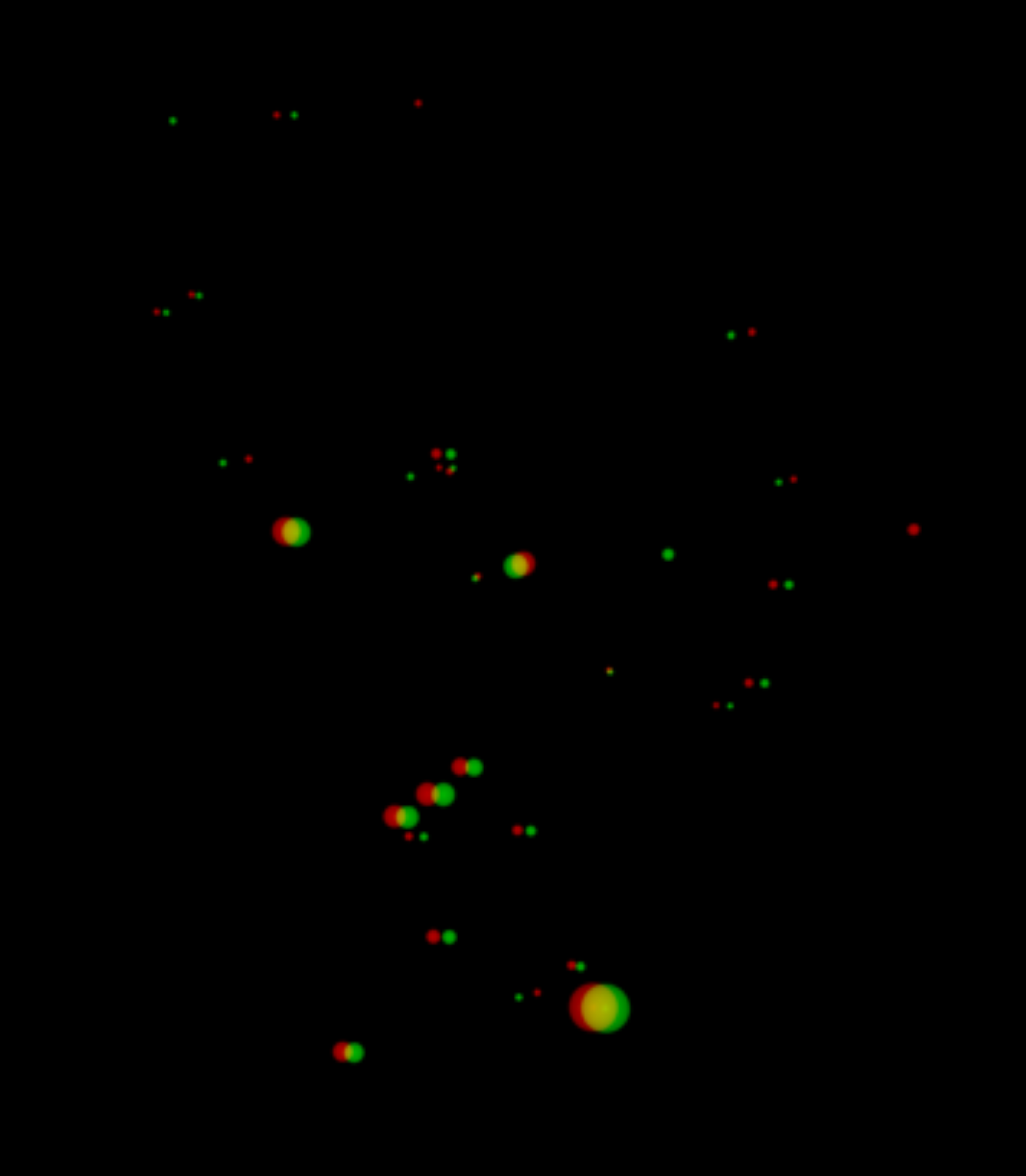
3D anaglyph showing stars by brightness (dot size) and distance (red–green difference)

=== Bright stars ===
- Betelgeuse, also designated Alpha Orionis, is a massive M-type red supergiant star nearing the end of its life. It is the second-brightest star in Orion, and is a semiregular variable star. It serves as the right shoulder of the hunter (assuming that he is facing the observer). It is generally the 11th-brightest star in the night sky, but this has varied between being the tenth to the 23rd-brightest by the end of 2019. The end of its life is expected to result in a supernova explosion that will be highly visible from Earth, possibly outshining the Moon and being visible during the day. This is most likely to occur within the next 100,000 years.
- Rigel, also known as Beta Orionis, is a B-type blue supergiant that is the seventh-brightest star in the night sky. Similar to Betelgeuse, Rigel is fusing heavy elements in its core and will pass its supergiant stage soon (on an astronomical timescale), possibly eventually ending in a supernova explosion. It serves as the left foot of the hunter.
- Bellatrix is designated Gamma Orionis by Johann Bayer. It is the 27th-brightest star in the night sky. Bellatrix is considered a B-type blue giant, though it is too small to explode in a supernova. Bellatrix's luminosity is derived from its high temperature rather than a large radius. Bellatrix marks Orion's left shoulder. Its name means "the female warrior", and is sometimes known colloquially as the "Amazon Star". It is the closest major star in Orion at only 244.6 light-years from the Solar System.
- Mintaka is designated Delta Orionis, despite being the faintest of the three stars in Orion's Belt. Its name means "the belt". It is a multiple star system, composed of a large B-type blue giant and a more massive O-type main sequence star. The Mintaka system constitutes an eclipsing binary variable star, where the eclipse of one star over the other creates a dip in brightness. Mintaka is the westernmost of the three stars of Orion's Belt, as well as the northernmost.
- Alnilam is designated Epsilon Orionis and is named for the Arabic phrase meaning "string of pearls". It is the middle and brightest of the three stars of Orion's Belt. Alnilam is a B-type blue supergiant; despite being nearly twice as far from the Sun as the other stars on the Belt, its luminosity makes it nearly equal in magnitude. Alnilam is losing mass quickly, a consequence of its size. It is the farthest major star in Orion, at 1,344 light-years.
- Alnitak, meaning "the girdle", is designated Zeta Orionis, and is the easternmost star in Orion's Belt. It is a triple star system, with the primary star being a hot blue supergiant and the brightest O-type star in the night sky.
- Saiph is designated Kappa Orionis by Bayer, and serves as Orion's right foot. It is of a similar distance and size to Rigel, but appears much fainter. It name means "the sword of the giant".
- Meissa is designated Lambda Orionis, forms Orion's head, and is a multiple star with a combined apparent magnitude of 3.33. Its name means "the shining one".

8 brightest stars of Orion
Proper name	Bayer designation	Light-years	Apparent magnitude
Betelgeuse	α Orionis	548	0.50
Rigel	β Orionis	863	0.13
Bellatrix	γ Orionis	250	1.64
Mintaka	δ Orionis	1,200	2.23
Alnilam	ε Orionis	1,344	1.69
Alnitak	ζ Orionis	1,260	1.77
Saiph	κ Orionis	650	2.09
Meissa	λ Orionis	1,320	3.33

=== Belt ===
Orion's Belt, or The Belt of Orion, is an asterism within the constellation. It consists of three bright stars: Alnitak (Zeta Orionis), Alnilam (Epsilon Orionis), and Mintaka (Delta Orionis). Alnitak is around 800 light-years away from Earth, 100,000 times more luminous than the Sun, and shines with a magnitude of 1.8; much of its radiation is in the ultraviolet range, which the human eye cannot see. Alnilam is approximately 2,000 light-years from Earth, shines with a magnitude of 1.70, and with an ultraviolet light that is 375,000 times more luminous than the Sun. Mintaka is 915 light-years away and shines with a magnitude of 2.21. It is 90,000 times more luminous than the Sun and is a double star: the two orbit each other every 5.73 days. In the Northern Hemisphere, Orion's Belt is best visible in the night sky during the month of January at around 9:00 pm, when it is approximately around the local meridian.

Just southwest of Alnitak lies Sigma Orionis, a multiple star system composed of five stars that have a combined apparent magnitude of 3.7 and lying at a distance of 1150 light-years. Southwest of Mintaka lies the quadruple star Eta Orionis.

=== Sword ===
Orion's Sword contains the Orion Nebula, the Messier 43 nebula, Sh 2-279 (also known as the Running Man Nebula), and the stars Theta Orionis, Iota Orionis, and 42 Orionis.

=== Head ===
Three stars comprise a small triangle that marks the head. The apex is marked by Meissa (Lambda Orionis), a hot blue giant of spectral type O8 III and apparent magnitude 3.54, which lies some 1100 light-years distant. Phi^{1} Orionis and Phi^{2} Orionis make up the base. Also nearby is the young star FU Orionis.

=== Club ===
Stretching north from Betelgeuse are the stars that make up Orion's club. Mu Orionis marks the elbow, Nu and Xi mark the handle of the club, and Chi^{1} and Chi^{2} mark the end of the club. Just east of Chi^{1} is the Mira-type variable red giant star U Orionis.

=== Shield ===
West from Bellatrix lie six stars all designated Pi Orionis (π^{1} Ori, π^{2} Ori, π^{3} Ori, π^{4} Ori, π^{5} Ori, and π^{6} Ori) which make up Orion's shield.

=== Meteor showers ===
Around 20 October each year, the Orionid meteor shower (Orionids) reaches its peak. Coming from the border with the constellation Gemini, as many as 20 meteors per hour can be seen. The shower's parent body is Halley's Comet.

=== Deep-sky objects ===
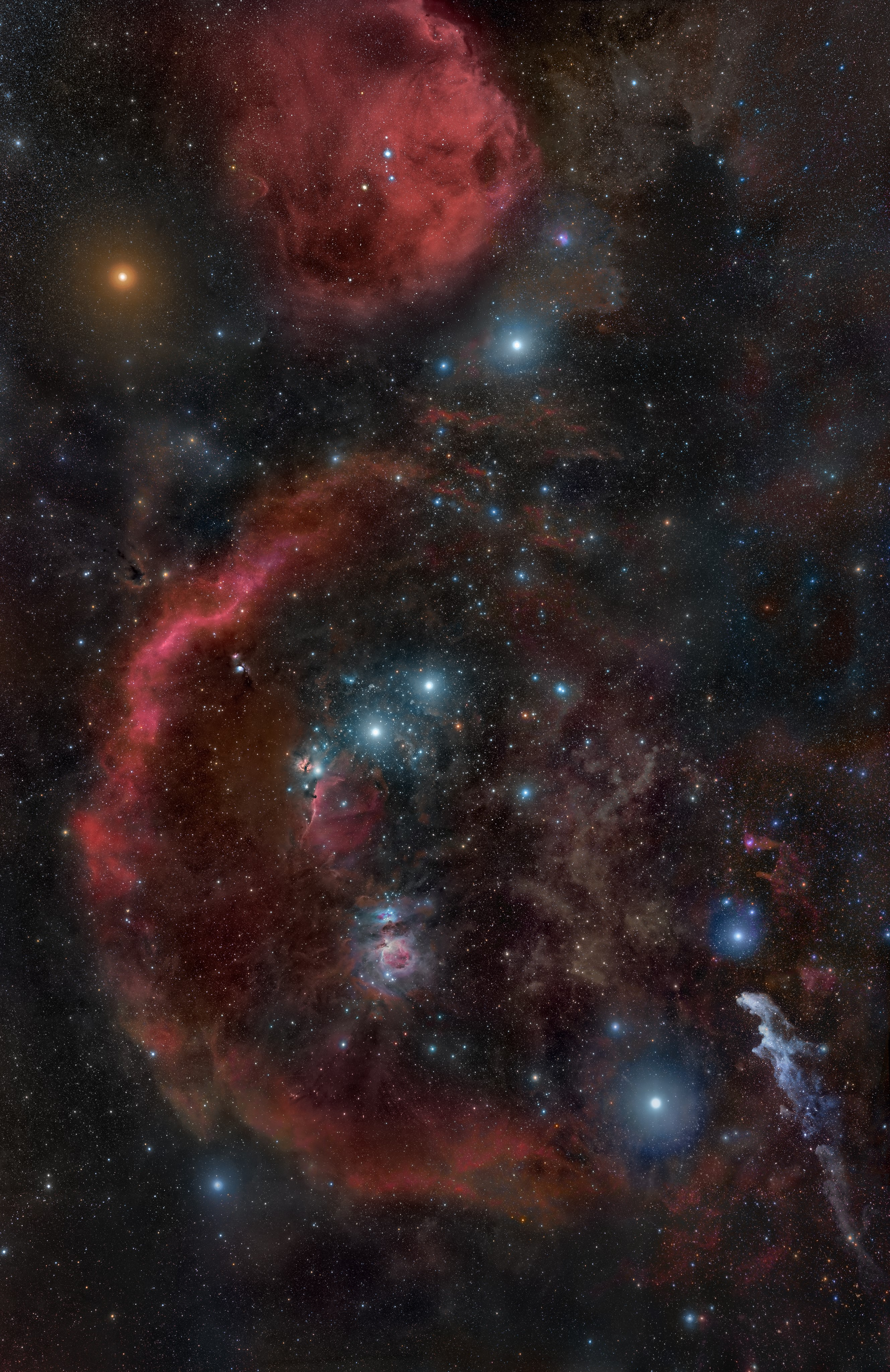
This view brings out many fainter features, such as Barnard's Loop.

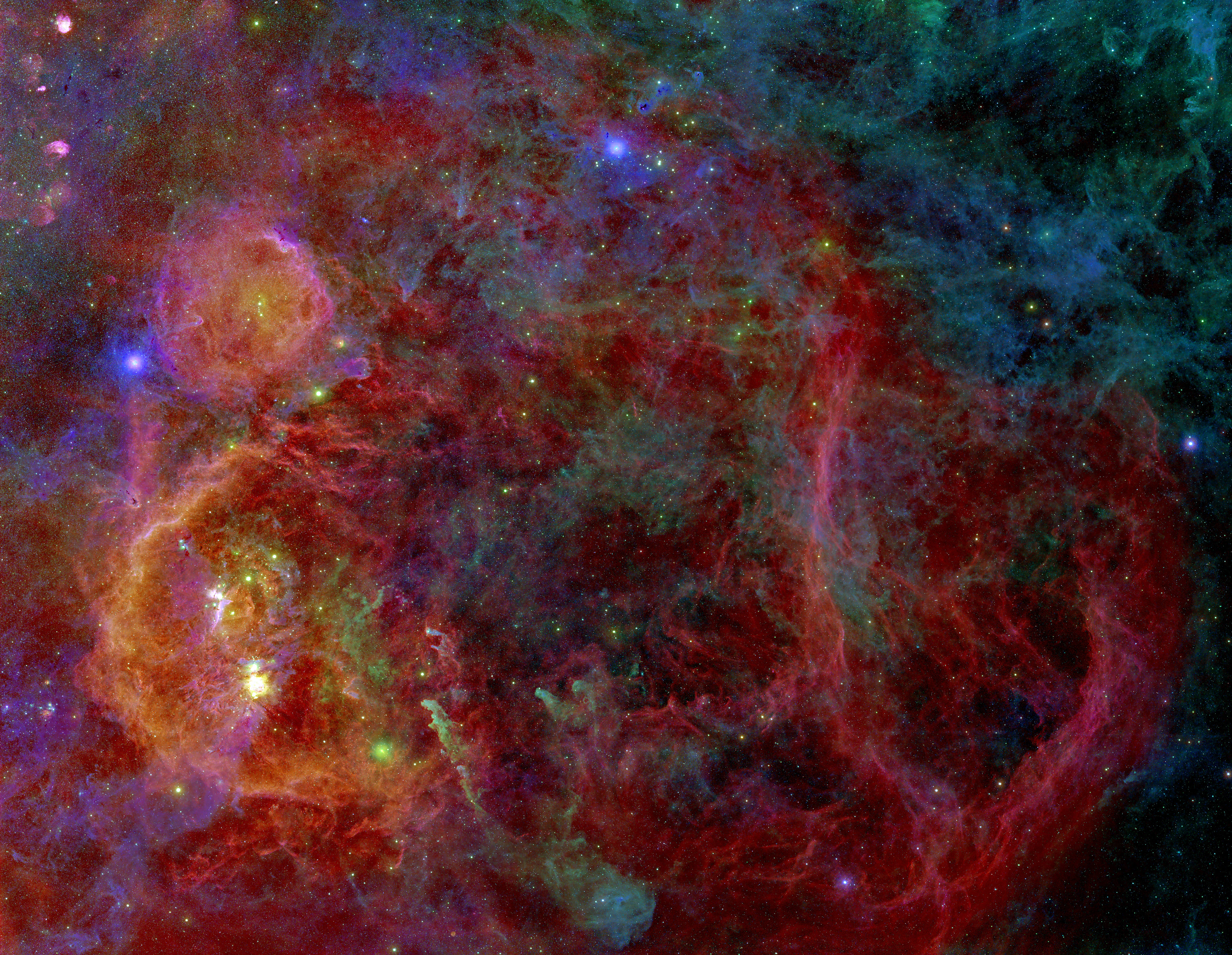
Wider view (50° x 39°) from the Northern Sky Narrowband Survey, showing most of the Orion–Eridanus Superbubble

Hanging from Orion's Belt is his sword, consisting of the multiple stars θ1 and θ2 Orionis, called the Trapezium and the Orion Nebula (M42). This is a spectacular object that can be clearly identified with the naked eye as something other than a star. Using binoculars, its clouds of nascent stars, luminous gas, and dust can be observed. The Trapezium cluster has many newborn stars, including several brown dwarfs, all of which are at an approximate distance of 1,500 light-years. Named for the four bright stars that form a trapezoid, it is largely illuminated by the brightest stars, which are only a few hundred thousand years old. Observations by the Chandra X-ray Observatory show both the extreme temperatures of the main stars—up to 60,000 kelvins—and the star forming regions still extant in the surrounding nebula.

M78 (NGC 2068) is a nebula in Orion. With an overall magnitude of 8.0, it is significantly dimmer than the Great Orion Nebula that lies to its south; however, it is at approximately the same distance, at 1600 light-years from Earth. It can easily be mistaken for a comet in the eyepiece of a telescope. M78 is associated with the variable star V351 Orionis, whose magnitude changes are visible in very short periods of time. Another fairly bright nebula in Orion is NGC 1999, also close to the Great Orion Nebula. It has an integrated magnitude of 10.5 and is 1500 light-years from Earth. The variable star V380 Orionis is embedded in NGC 1999.

Another famous nebula is IC 434, the Horsehead Nebula, near Alnitak (Zeta Orionis). It contains a dark dust cloud whose shape gives the nebula its name.

NGC 2174 is an emission nebula located 6400 light-years from Earth.

Besides these nebulae, surveying Orion with a small telescope will reveal a wealth of interesting deep-sky objects, including M43, M78, and multiple stars including Iota Orionis and Sigma Orionis. A larger telescope may reveal objects such as the Flame Nebula (NGC 2024), as well as fainter and tighter multiple stars and nebulae. Barnard's Loop can be seen on very dark nights or using long-exposure photography.

All of these nebulae are part of the larger Orion molecular cloud complex, which is located approximately 1,500 light-years away and is hundreds of light-years across. Due to its proximity, it is one of the most intense regions of stellar formation visible from Earth. The Orion molecular cloud complex forms the eastern part of an even larger structure, the Orion–Eridanus Superbubble, which is visible in X-rays and in hydrogen emissions.

== History and mythology ==
The distinctive pattern of Orion is recognized in numerous cultures around the world, and many myths are associated with it. Orion is used as a symbol in the modern world.

=== Siberia ===
In Siberia, the Chukchi people see Orion as a hunter; an arrow he has shot is represented by Aldebaran (Alpha Tauri), with the same figure as other Western depictions.

=== Europe ===
==== Greco-Roman antiquity ====
In Greek mythology, Orion was a gigantic, supernaturally strong hunter, born to Euryale, a Gorgon, and Poseidon (Neptune), god of the sea. One myth recounts Gaia's rage at Orion, who dared to say that he would kill every animal on Earth. The angry goddess tried to dispatch Orion with a scorpion. This is given as the reason that the constellations of Scorpius and Orion are never in the sky at the same time. However, Ophiuchus, the Serpent Bearer, revived Orion with an antidote. This is said to be the reason that the constellation of Ophiuchus stands midway between the Scorpion and the Hunter in the sky.

The constellation is mentioned in Horace's Odes (Ode 3.27.18), Homer's Odyssey (Book 5, line 283) and Iliad, and Virgil's Aeneid (Book 1, line 535).

==== European folklore ====
In old Hungarian tradition, Orion is known as "Archer" (Íjász), or "Reaper" (Kaszás). In recently rediscovered myths, he is called Nimrod (Hungarian: Nimród), the greatest hunter, father of the twins Hunor and Magor. The π and o stars (on upper right) form together the reflex bow or the lifted scythe. In other Hungarian traditions, Orion's Belt is known as "Judge's stick" (Bírópálca).

In Ireland and Scotland, Orion was called An Bodach, a figure from Irish folklore whose name literally means "the one with a penis [bod]" and was the husband of the Cailleach (hag).

In Scandinavian tradition, Orion's Belt was known as "Frigg's Distaff" (friggerock) or "Freyja's distaff".

The Finns call Orion's Belt and the stars below it "Väinämöinen's scythe" (Väinämöisen viikate). Another name for the asterism of Alnilam, Alnitak, and Mintaka is "Väinämöinen's Belt" (Väinämöisen vyö) and the stars "hanging" from the Belt as "Kaleva's sword" (Kalevanmiekka).

There are claims in popular media that the Adorant from the Geißenklösterle cave, an ivory carving estimated to be 35,000 to 40,000 years old, is the first known depiction of the constellation. Scholars dismiss such interpretations, saying that perceived details such as a belt and sword derive from preexisting features in the grain structure of the ivory.

=== Ancient Near East ===
Artwork of the constellation Orion

The Babylonian star catalogues of the Late Bronze Age name Orion ^{MUL}SIPA.ZI.AN.NA, (Note: The determiner glyph for "constellation" or "star" in these lists is MUL (𒀯). See Babylonian star catalogues.) "The Heavenly Shepherd" or "True Shepherd of Anu" – Anu being the chief god of the heavenly realms. The Babylonian constellation is sacred to Papshukal and Ninshubur, both minor gods fulfilling the role of "messenger to the gods". Papshukal is closely associated with the figure of a walking bird on Babylonian boundary stones, and on the star map the figure of the Rooster is located below and behind the figure of the True Shepherd—both constellations represent the herald of the gods, in his bird and human forms respectively.

In ancient Egypt, the stars of Orion were regarded as a god, called Sah. Because Orion rises before Sirius, the star whose heliacal rising was the basis for the Solar Egyptian calendar, Sah was closely linked with Sopdet, the goddess who personified Sirius. The god Sopdu is said to be the son of Sah and Sopdet. Sah is syncretized with Osiris, while Sopdet is syncretized with Osiris' mythological wife, Isis. In the Pyramid Texts, from the 24th and 23rd centuries BC, Sah is one of many gods whose form the dead pharaoh is said to take in the afterlife.

The Armenians identified their legendary patriarch and founder Hayk with Orion. Hayk is also the name of the Orion constellation in the Armenian translation of the Bible.

The Bible mentions Orion three times, naming it "Kesil" (כסיל, literally – fool). Though, this name perhaps is etymologically connected with "Kislev", the name for the ninth month of the Hebrew calendar (i.e. November–December), which, in turn, may derive from the Hebrew root K-S-L as in the words "kesel, kisla" (כֵּסֶל, כִּסְלָה, hope, positiveness), i.e. hope for winter rains.: Job 9:9 ("He is the maker of the Bear and Orion"), Job 38:31 ("Can you loosen Orion's belt?"), and Amos 5:8 ("He who made the Pleiades and Orion").

In ancient Aram, the constellation was known as N^{e}phîlā′, the Nephilim are said to be Orion's descendants.

=== Middle East ===
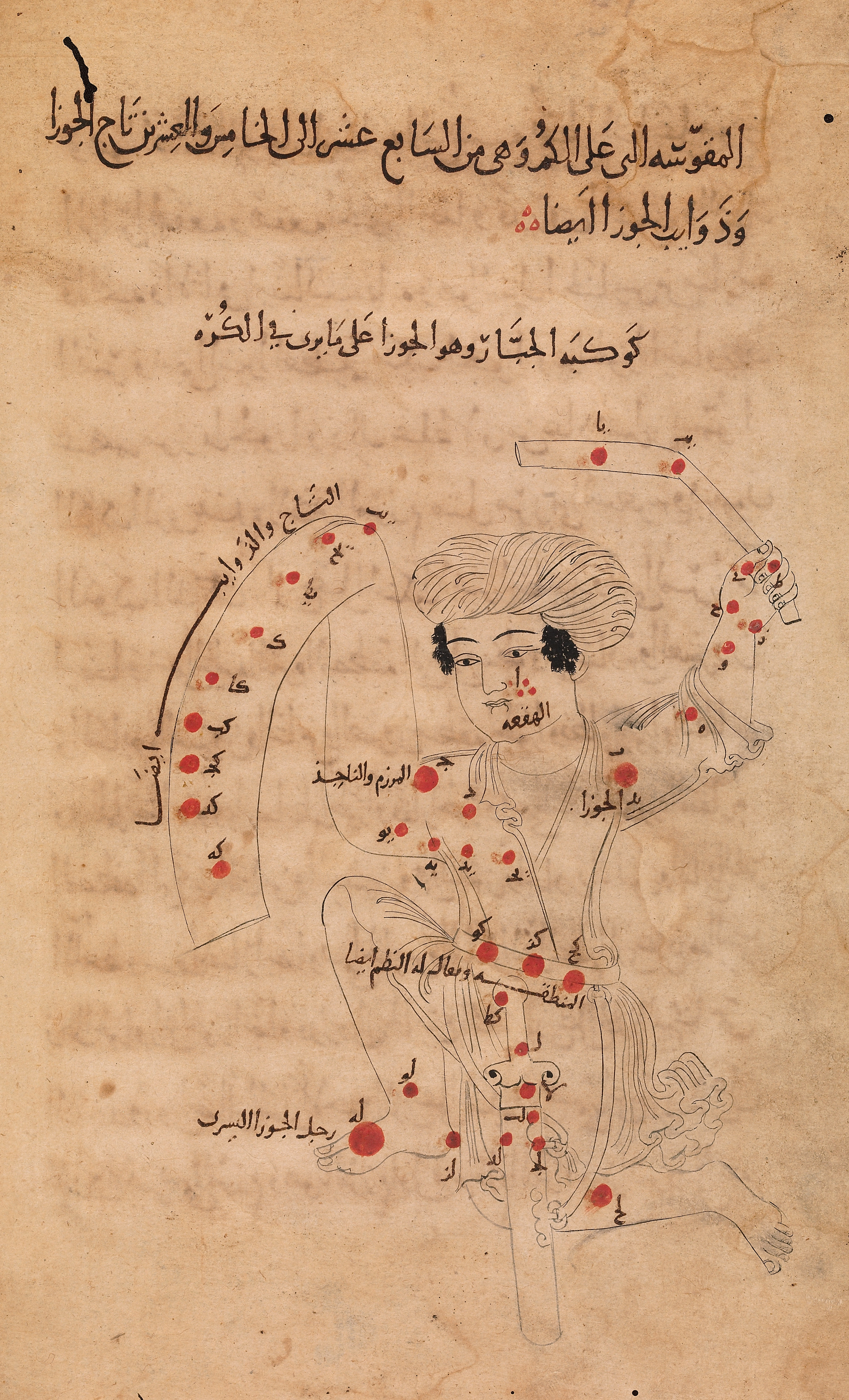
From the Persian Book of Fixed Stars (962 AD), showing Orion mirrored, as on a celestial globe

In traditional Arab astronomy, Orion was seen as a female figure named Jawza’. The modern star name Betelgeuse is derived from the Arabic yad al-Jawza’ "the hand of Jawza’". Orion was later also known as al-jabbar, "the giant", from adoption of the Greek constellation. Orion's sixth brightest star, Saiph is named from the Arabic, saif al-jabbar, meaning "sword of the giant".

=== China ===
In China, Orion was one of the 28 lunar mansions Sieu (Xiù) (宿). It is known as Shen (參), literally meaning "three", for the stars of Orion's Belt. The Chinese character 參 (pinyin shēn) originally meant the constellation Orion (Chinese: 參宿; pinyin: shēnxiù); its Shang dynasty version, over three millennia old, contains at the top a representation of the three stars of Orion's Belt atop a man's head (the bottom portion representing the sound of the word was added later).

=== India ===
The Rigveda refers to the constellation as Mriga (the Deer).

Nataraja, "the cosmic dancer", is often interpreted as the representation of Orion. Rudra, the Rigvedic form of Shiva, is the presiding deity of Ardra nakshatra (Betelgeuse) of Hindu astrology.

The Jain Symbol carved in the Udayagiri and Khandagiri Caves, India in 1st century BC has a striking resemblance with Orion.

Bugis sailors identified the three stars in Orion's Belt as tanra tellué, meaning "sign of three".

=== Americas ===
The Seri people of northwestern Mexico call the three stars in Orion's Belt Hapj (a name denoting a hunter) which consists of three stars: Hap (mule deer), Haamoja (pronghorn), and Mojet (bighorn sheep). Hap is in the middle and has been shot by the hunter; its blood has dripped onto Tiburón Island.

The same three stars are known in Spain and most of Latin America as "Las tres Marías" (Spanish for "The Three Marys"). In Puerto Rico, the three stars are known as the "Los Tres Reyes Magos" (Spanish for The Three Wise Men).

The Ojibwa/Chippewa Native Americans call this constellation Mesabi ("big man"). Likewise, an Ininewuk (Cree) story names the constellation Mistâpêw (with the same meaning), telling that a giant enters the dreams of seven sleeping brothers in order to imprison their souls within stones. They are freed by their nephew, who builds the first sweat lodge to release the souls; the sweat lodge is represented by the constellation classically known as Corona Borealis.

To the Lakota Native Americans, Tayamnicankhu (Orion's Belt) is the spine of a bison. The great rectangle of Orion is the bison's ribs; the Pleiades star cluster in nearby Taurus is the bison's head; and Sirius in Canis Major, known as Tayamnisinte, is its tail. Another Lakota myth mentions that the bottom half of Orion, the Constellation of the Hand, represented the arm of a chief that was ripped off by the Thunder People as a punishment from the gods for his selfishness. His daughter offered to marry the person who can retrieve his arm from the sky, so the young warrior Fallen Star (whose father was a star and whose mother was human) returned his arm and married his daughter, symbolizing harmony between the gods and humanity with the help of the younger generation. The index finger is represented by Rigel; the Orion Nebula is the thumb; the Belt of Orion is the wrist; and the star Beta Eridani is the pinky finger.

=== Austronesian ===
The seven primary stars of Orion make up the Polynesian constellation Heiheionakeiki which represents a child's string figure similar to a cat's cradle. Several precolonial Filipinos referred to the belt region in particular as "balatik" (ballista) as it resembles a trap of the same name which fires arrows by itself and is usually used for catching pigs from the bush. Spanish colonization later led to some ethnic groups referring to Orion's Belt as "Tres Marias" or "Tatlong Maria."

In Māori tradition, the star Rigel (known as Puanga or Puaka) is closely connected with the celebration of Matariki. The rising of Matariki (the Pleiades) and Rigel before sunrise in midwinter marks the start of the Māori year.

The Malay people refer to the Orion as Buruj Belantik (literally "The hunter constellation"). This constellation, when it is near the western horizon, is often used to indicate the direction of the qibla, the Islamic direction of prayer for the people of the Malay Archipelago. Like other stars, those of Orion also serve as navigational guides for Malay sailors.

In Javanese culture, the constellation is often called Lintang Waluku or Bintang Bajak, referring to the shape of a paddy field plow.

=== Contemporary symbolism ===
The imagery of the Belt and Sword has found its way into popular Western culture, for example in the form of the shoulder insignia of the 27th Infantry Division of the United States Army during both World Wars, probably owing to a pun on the name of the division's first commander, Major General John F. O'Ryan.

The film distribution company Orion Pictures used the constellation as its logo.

=== Depictions ===
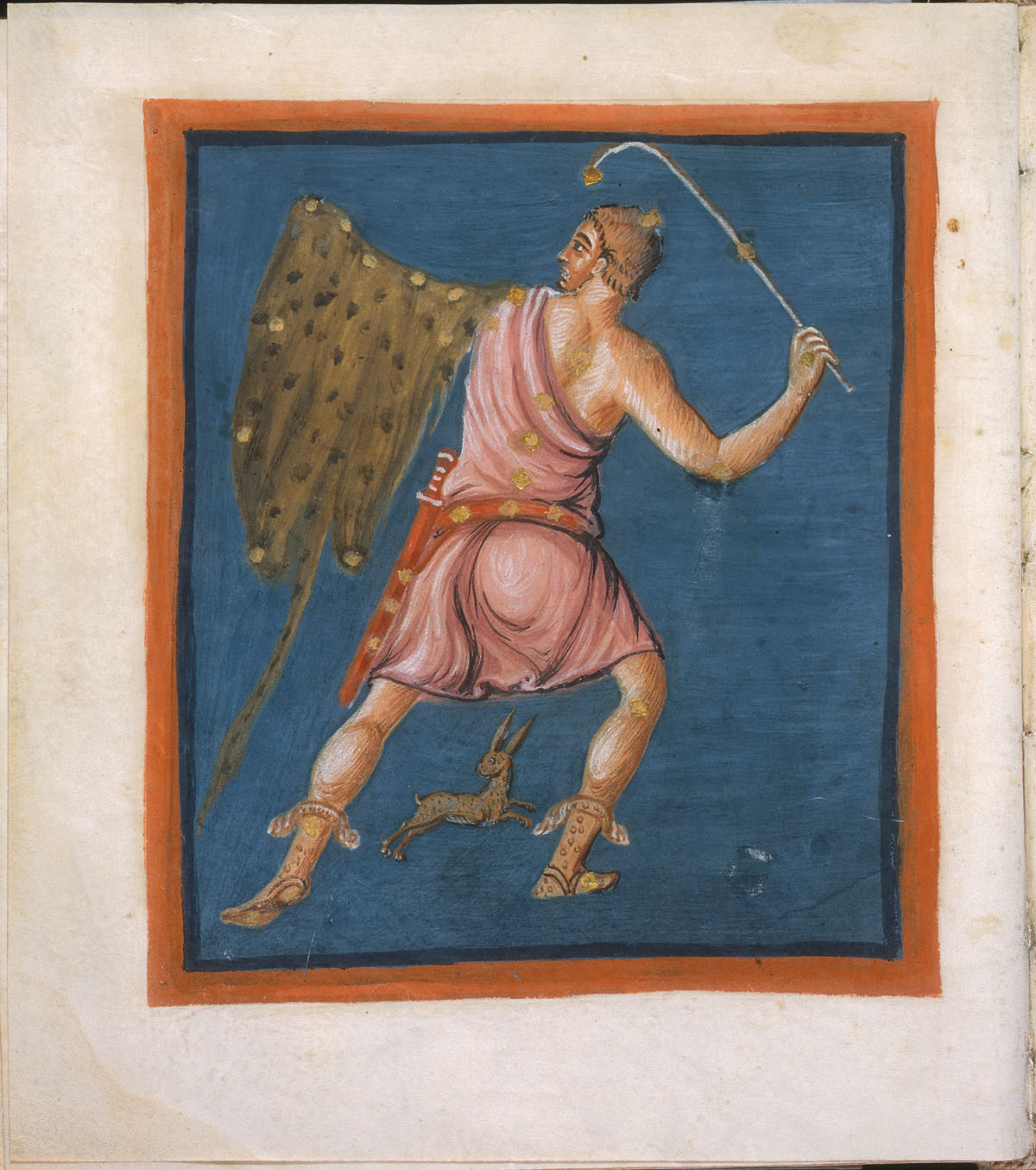
Orion in the 9th century Leiden Aratea

In artistic renderings, the surrounding constellations are sometimes related to Orion: he is depicted standing next to the river Eridanus with his two hunting dogs Canis Major and Canis Minor, fighting Taurus. He is sometimes depicted hunting Lepus the hare. He sometimes is depicted to have a lion's hide in his hand.

There are alternative ways to visualise Orion. From the Southern Hemisphere, Orion is oriented south-upward, and the Belt and Sword are sometimes called the saucepan or pot in Australia and New Zealand. Orion's Belt is called Drie Konings (Three Kings) or the Drie Susters (Three Sisters) by Afrikaans speakers in South Africa and are referred to as les Trois Rois (the Three Kings) in Daudet's Lettres de Mon Moulin (1866). The appellation Driekoningen (the Three Kings) is also often found in 17th and 18th-century Dutch star charts and seaman's guides. The same three stars are known in Spain, Latin America, and the Philippines as "Las Tres Marías" (The Three Marys), and as "Los Tres Reyes Magos" (The Three Wise Men) in Puerto Rico.

Even traditional depictions of Orion have varied greatly. Cicero drew Orion in a similar fashion to the modern depiction. The Hunter held an unidentified animal skin aloft in his right hand; his hand was represented by Omicron^{2} Orionis and the skin was represented by the five stars designated Pi Orionis. Saiph and Rigel represented his left and right knees, while Eta Orionis and Lambda Leporis were his left and right feet, respectively. As in the modern depiction, Mintaka, Alnilam, and Alnitak represented his Belt. His left shoulder was represented by Betelgeuse, and Mu Orionis made up his left arm. Meissa was his head, and Bellatrix his right shoulder. The depiction of Hyginus was similar to that of Cicero, though the two differed in a few important areas. Cicero's animal skin became Hyginus's shield (Omicron and Pi Orionis), and instead of an arm marked out by Mu Orionis, he holds a club (Chi Orionis). His right leg is represented by Theta Orionis and his left leg is represented by Lambda, Mu, and Epsilon Leporis. Further Western European and Arabic depictions have followed these two models.

== Future ==
Animation showing Orion's proper motion from 50000 BC to 50000 AD. Pi^{3} Orionis moves the most rapidly.

Orion is located on the celestial equator, but it will not always be so located due to the effects of precession of the Earth's axis. Orion lies well south of the ecliptic, and it only happens to lie on the celestial equator because the point on the ecliptic that corresponds to the June solstice is close to the border of Gemini and Taurus, to the north of Orion. Precession will eventually carry Orion further south, and by AD 14000, Orion will be far enough south that it will no longer be visible from the latitude of Great Britain.

Further in the future, Orion's stars will gradually move away from the constellation due to proper motion. However, Orion's brightest stars all lie at a large distance from Earth on an astronomical scale—much farther away than Sirius, for example. Orion will still be recognizable long after most of the other constellations—composed of relatively nearby stars—have distorted into new configurations, with the exception of a few of its stars eventually exploding as supernovae, for example Betelgeuse, which is predicted to explode sometime in the next million years.

== See also ==
- EURion constellation
- Hubble 3D (2010), IMAX film with an elaborate CGI "fly-through" of the Orion Nebula
- Orion correlation theory
- Orion (mythology)
- Orion (Chinese astronomy)
- Peripheral nebular regions of the Orion Complex
- Aurvandill
- Glooscap
- Heiheionakeiki
- Julpan
- Nataraja
- Osiris
- Papsukkal
- Urania
- Winter Hexagon
