= Eta Orionis =

Star in the constellation Orion

η Orionis
- Location of η Orionis (circled)

Observation data Epoch J2000 Equinox ICRS
- Constellation: Orion
- Right ascension: 05^{h} 24^{m} 28.61672^{s}
- Declination: −02° 23′ 49.7311″
- Apparent magnitude (V): 3.42 (4.50 + 5.90 + 5.65 + 4.95)

Characteristics
- Spectral type: Aa: B1 V Ab: B3 V Ac: B3 V B: B2 V
- U−B color index: −0.90
- B−V color index: −0.17
- Variable type: Algol

Astrometry
Radial velocity (R_{v})	+19.8 km/s
Proper motion (μ)	RA: −0.71 mas/yr Dec.: −3.46 mas/yr
Parallax (π)	3.34±1.07 mas
Distance	approx. 1,000 ly (approx. 300 pc)

Orbit
Primary	Aa
Name	Ab
Period (P)	7.98763(22) days
Eccentricity (e)	0.0095±0.0010
Inclination (i)	87.62±0.42°
Argument of periastron (ω) (primary)	164±18°
Semi-amplitude (K_{1}) (primary)	145.5±0.03 km/s
Semi-amplitude (K_{2}) (secondary)	150±3 km/s

Orbit
Name	Ac
Period (P)	9.442±0.012 yr
Semi-major axis (a)	0.0441±0.0015″
Eccentricity (e)	0.45±0.02
Inclination (i)	102.8±1.8°

Details

η Ori Aa
Mass	10.87±0.44 M_{☉}
Radius	6.477±0.073 R_{☉}
Surface gravity (log g)	3.851±0.010 cgs
Temperature	26,600 K
Rotational velocity (v sin i)	20 km/s

η Ori Ab
Mass	10.54±0.22 M_{☉}
Radius	4.79±0.10 R_{☉}
Surface gravity (log g)	4.100±0.016 cgs
Temperature	25,950 K
Rotational velocity (v sin i)	130 km/s

η Ori Ac
Mass	6.78 M_{☉}

η Ori B
Mass	8.7 M_{☉}

Other designations
- η Ori, 28 Orionis, BD−02°1235, HD 35411, HIP 25281, HR 1788, SAO 132071

Database references
SIMBAD	data

Eta Orionis is a multiple star in the constellation Orion. It lies a little to the west of Orion's Belt between Delta Orionis and Rigel, being closer to Delta Orionis than to Rigel. It lies at a distance of around 1,000 light-years from Earth and is part of the Orion OB1 association.

== Nomenclature ==
Eta Orionis, Latinized from η Orionis, is the star's Bayer designation. It has the traditional Arabic name Saif al-Jabbar (سيف الجبار), lit. 'the Sword of the Giant', but this name is now used for another star, Saiph (Kappa Orionis). It has also sometimes been called by the Latin name Ensis, and Algjebbah.

== System ==
Eta Orionis is listed in multiple star catalogues as having two companions: a bright component B less than 2″ away; and a faint component C nearly 2′ away. The two are estimated to orbit every 1,800 years.

The primary star, Eta Orionis A, is itself a spectroscopic triple star, known from multiple spectral lines with varying radial velocities. The most distant component Ac, has been resolved using speckle interferometry, at a separation of about 0.04″. It orbits the other two in 9.4 years. The two closest stars, Aa and Ab, are separated by only about a tenth of an astronomical unit and orbit in just under eight days.

The system lies within the Orion OB1 association, a group of massive stars that includes most of the bright stars of Orion. It is assigned to the oldest and closest part of the association, known as OB1a.

== Variability ==
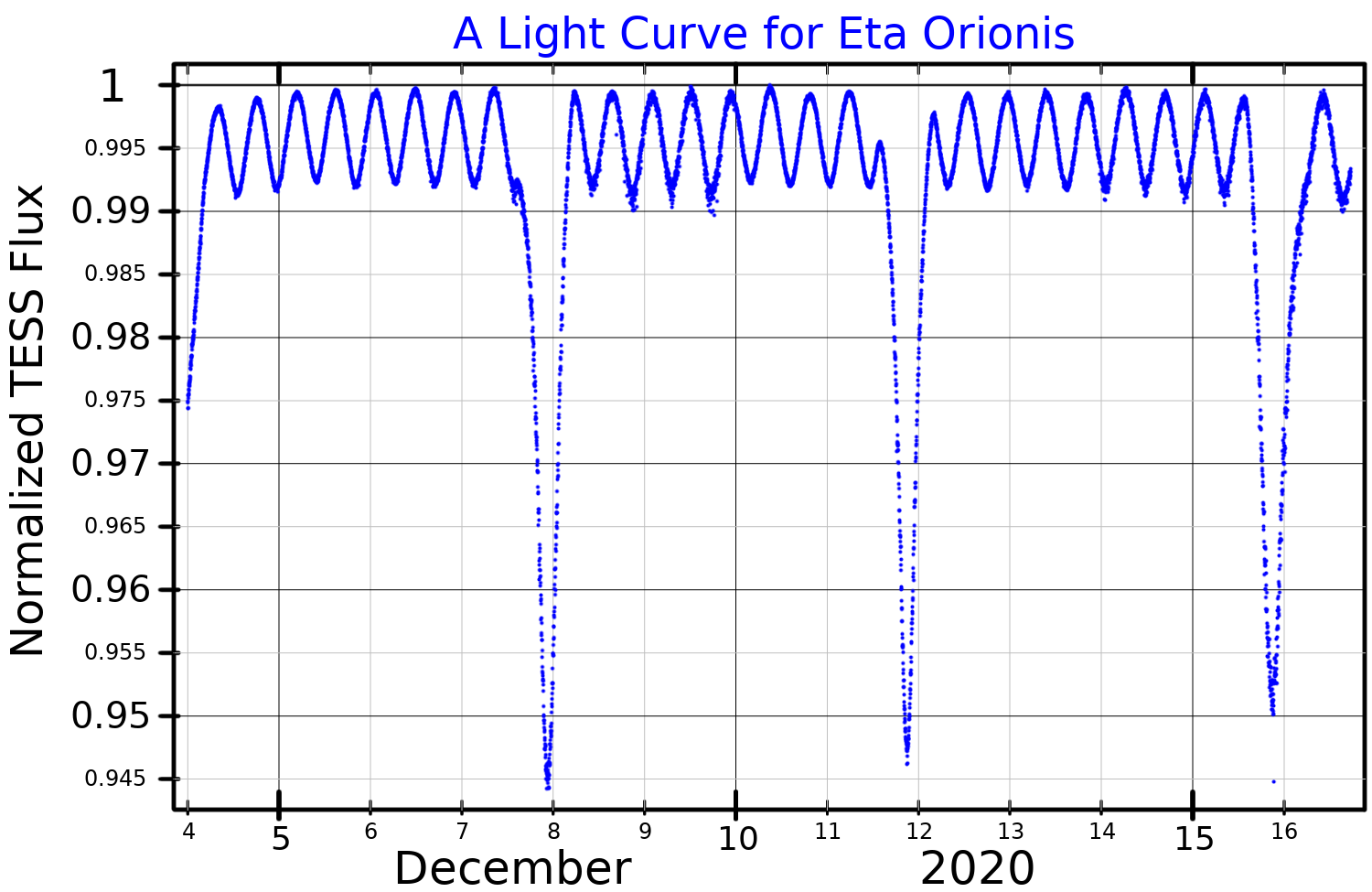
A light curve for Eta Orionis, plotted from TESS data, showing both eclipses and the 0.432 day variability.

Eta Orionis drops in brightness every four days from a combined apparent magnitude of 3.31 to about magnitude 3.6. This is due to eclipses between the two closest components, Aa and Ab. The primary and secondary eclipses are very similar, 0.24 and 0.23 magnitudes deep, respectively.

It has also been suggested that component Ab is intrinsically variable with a period of 0.3 days and a very small amplitude. This star has unusual variable spectral lines and lies with the β Cephei variable instability strip. However, it is now thought that the variable component is either B and Ac, possibly due to an unseen companion or rotational modulation. The actual period is 0.432 days and the 0.3-day period was an alias.

== See also ==
- Orion's Sword
