= Alnitak =

Triple star system in the constellation Orion

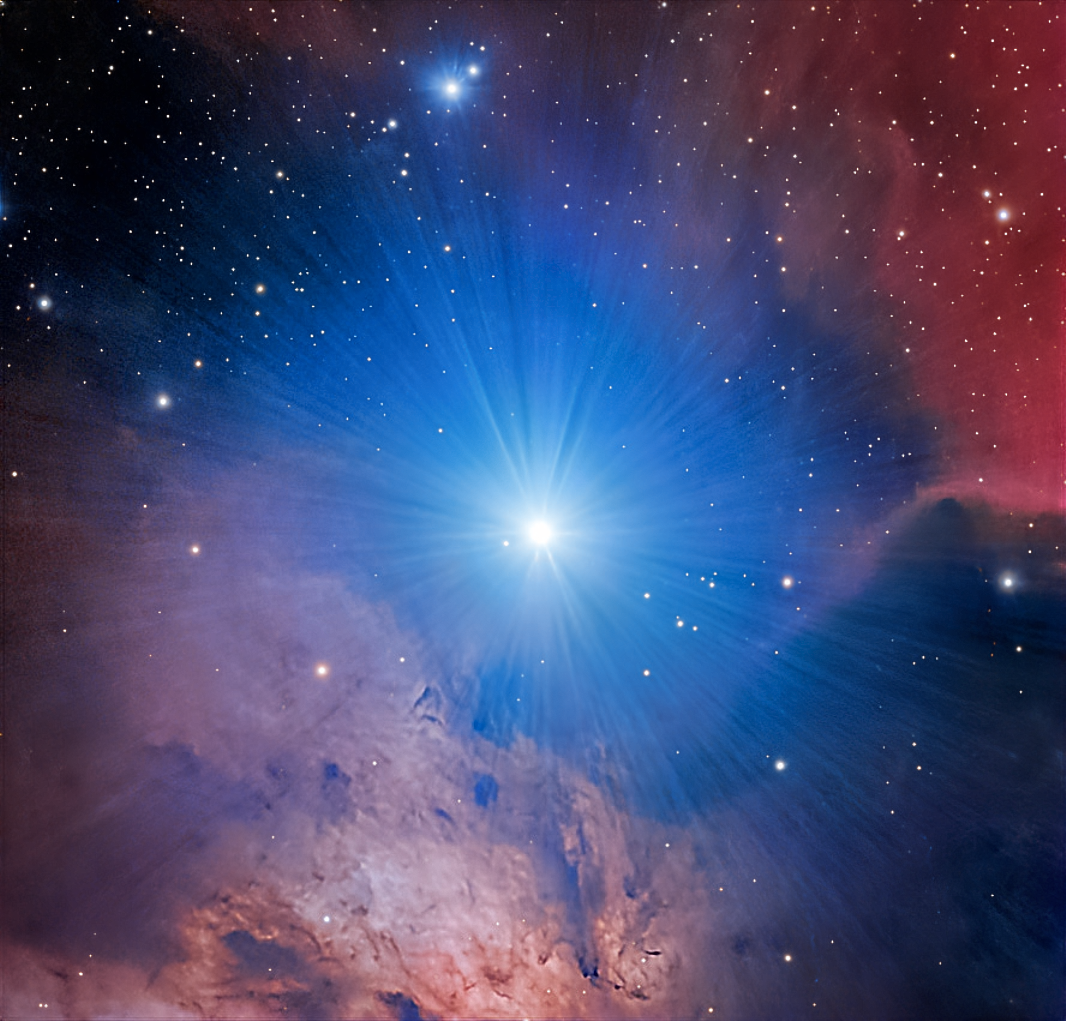
- Alnitak between the Horsehead Nebula and the Flame Nebula

Observation data Epoch J2000 Equinox ICRS
- Constellation: Orion
- Pronunciation: /ælˈnaɪtæk/,
- Right ascension: 05^{h} 40^{m} 45.52666^{s}
- Declination: −01° 56′ 34.2649″
- Apparent magnitude (V): 1.77 (2.08 + 4.28 + 4.01)

Characteristics
- Evolutionary stage: Blue supergiant (Aa)
- Spectral type: O9.5Iab + B1IV + B0III
- U−B color index: −1.06
- B−V color index: −0.11 (A) −0.20 (B)

Astrometry
Radial velocity (R_{v})	18.50 km/s
Proper motion (μ)	RA: 3.19 mas/yr Dec.: 2.03 mas/yr
Parallax (π)	4.43±0.64 mas
Distance	1,260 ± 180 ly (387 ± 54 pc)
Absolute magnitude (M_{V})	−6.0 / −3.9 / −4.1

Orbit
Primary	Aa
Secondary	Ab
Period (P)	2,687.3±7.0 d
Semi-major axis (a)	35.9±0.2 mas
Eccentricity (e)	0.338±0.004
Inclination (i)	139.3±0.6°
Longitude of the node (Ω)	83.8±0.8°
Periastron epoch (T)	JD 2452734.2±9.0
Argument of periastron (ω) (secondary)	204.2±1.2°
Semi-amplitude (K_{1}) (primary)	10.1 km/s
Semi-amplitude (K_{2}) (secondary)	19.6 km/s

Orbit
Primary	A
Secondary	B
Period (P)	1,508.6 yr
Semi-major axis (a)	2.728″
Eccentricity (e)	0.07
Inclination (i)	72.0°
Longitude of the node (Ω)	155.5°
Periastron epoch (T)	2,070.6
Argument of periastron (ω) (secondary)	47.3°

Details

Alnitak Aa
Mass	33±10 M_{☉}
Radius	22.8±1.3 R_{☉}
Luminosity	250,000 L_{☉}
Surface gravity (log g)	3.2±0.1 cgs
Temperature	29,500±1,000 K
Rotation	6.67 days
Rotational velocity (v sin i)	110±10 km/s
Age	6.4 Myr

Alnitak Ab
Mass	14±3 M_{☉}
Radius	7.3±1.0 R_{☉}
Luminosity	32,000 L_{☉}
Temperature	29,000 K
Age	7.2 Myr

Alnitak B
Mass	16.7 M_{☉}
Rotational velocity (v sin i)	350 km/s
Age	~7 Myr

Other designations
- 126 G. Orionis, ζ Orionis, 50 Orionis, BD−02°1338, HIP 26727, SAO 132444, WDS J05407-0157
- A: HD 37742, HR 1948
- B: HD 37743, HR 1949

Database references
SIMBAD	AB
- A
- B

Alnitak is a triple star system in the constellation of Orion. It has the designations ζ Orionis, which is Latinised to Zeta Orionis and abbreviated Zeta Ori or ζ Ori, and 50 Orionis, abbreviated 50 Ori. The system is located at a distance of several hundred parsecs from the Sun and is one of the three main stars of Orion's Belt along with Alnilam and Mintaka.

The primary star, Alnitak Aa, is a hot blue supergiant with an absolute magnitude of −6.0 and is the brightest class O star in the night sky with a visual magnitude of +2.0. It has two companions—Ab and B, the latter known for the longest time and the former discovered recently, producing a combined magnitude for the trio of +1.77. The stars are members of the Orion OB1 association and the Collinder 70 association.

== Observational history ==
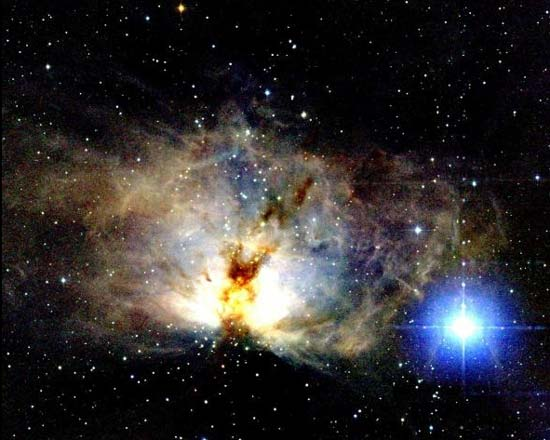
Alnitak (lower right) and the Flame Nebula at infrared wavelengths

Alnitak has been known since antiquity and, as a component of Orion's Belt, has been of widespread cultural significance. It was reported to be a double star by amateur German astronomer George K. Kunowsky in 1819. Much more recently, in 1998, the bright primary was found by a team from the Lowell Observatory to have a close companion; this had been suspected from observations made with the Narrabri Stellar Intensity Interferometer in the 1970s.

The stellar parallax derived from observations by the Hipparcos satellite imply a distance around 225 parsecs, but this does not take into account distortions caused by the multiple nature of the system. Larger distances, typically closer to 400 pc, have been derived by many authors based on the orbit of the pair or the assumed properties of the components. This distance is comparable to the Orion molecular cloud complex, including the nearby Flame and Horsehead Nebulae.

== Stellar system ==
Alnitak Aa compared to the Sun (to scale)

Alnitak is a triple star system at the eastern end of Orion's Belt, the second-magnitude primary having a 4th-magnitude companion nearly 3 arcseconds distant, in an orbit taking over 1,500 years.

The part called Alnitak A is itself a close binary, comprising the stars Alnitak Aa and Alnitak Ab.

Alnitak Aa is a blue supergiant of spectral type O9.5Iab with an absolute magnitude of −6.0 and an apparent magnitude of 2.0. It is estimated as being up to 33 times as massive as the Sun and a diameter 20 times greater. It is some 21,000 times brighter than the Sun, with a surface brightness (luminance) some 500 times greater. It is the brightest star of class O in the night sky. In about a million years, it will expand into a red supergiant wider than the orbit of Jupiter before ending its life in a supernova explosion, likely leaving behind a black hole.

Alnitak Ab is a blue subgiant of spectral type B1IV with an absolute magnitude of −3.9 and an apparent magnitude of 4.3, discovered in 1998.

A fourth star, 9th-magnitude Alnitak C, has not been confirmed to be part of the Aa–Ab–B group, and may simply lie along the line of sight.

The Alnitak system is bathed in the nebulosity of IC 434.

== Etymology and cultural significance ==
ζ Orionis (Latinised as Zeta Orionis) is the star system's Bayer designation and 50 Orionis its Flamsteed designation.

The traditional name Alnitak, alternately spelled Al Nitak or Alnitah, is taken from the Arabic النطاق an-niṭāq, "the girdle". In 2016, the International Astronomical Union organized a Working Group on Star Names (WGSN) to catalog and standardize proper names for stars. The WGSN's first bulletin of July 2016 included a table of the first two batches of names approved by the WGSN; which included Alnitak for the star ζ Orionis Aa. It is now so entered in the IAU Catalog of Star Names.

=== Orion's Belt ===
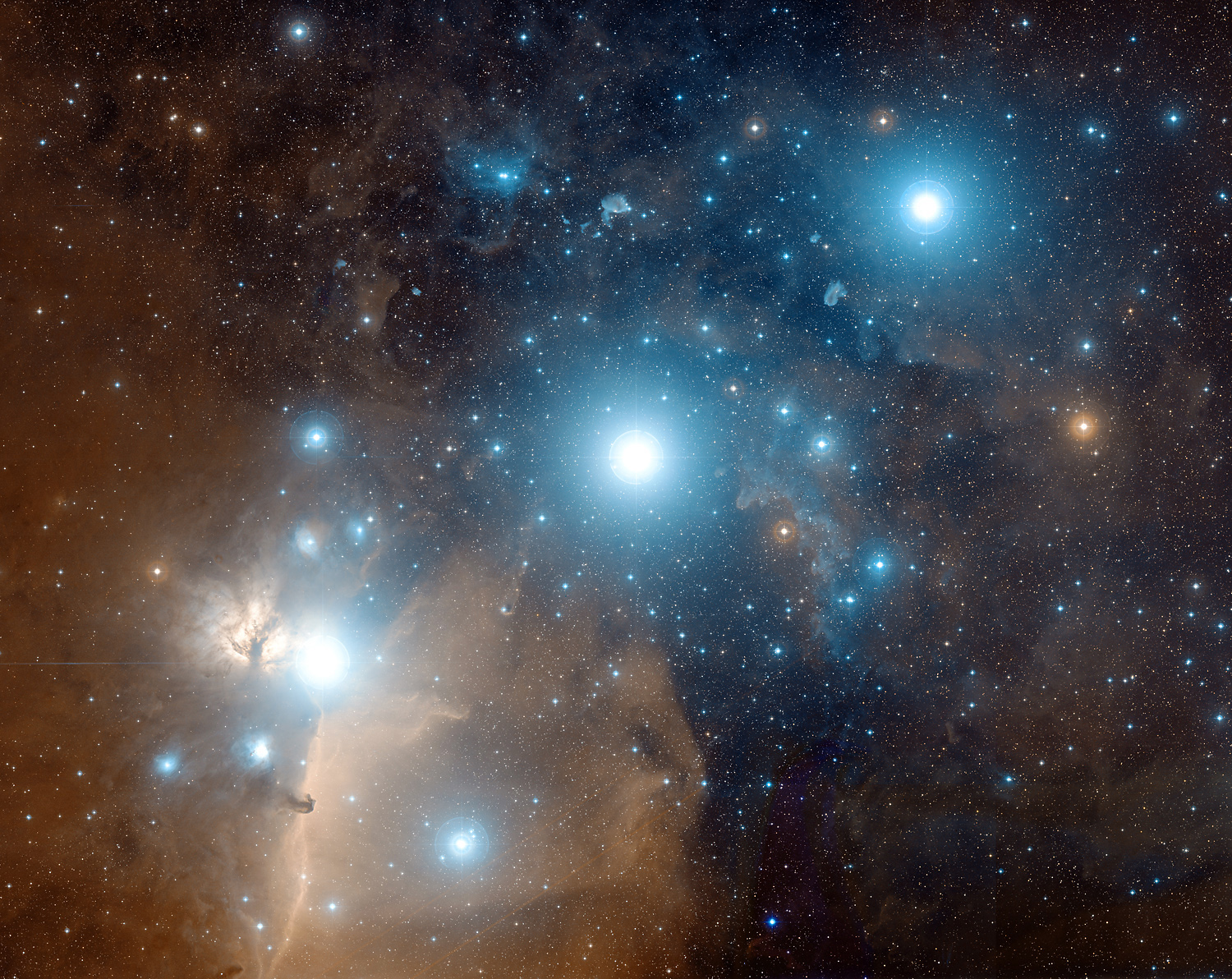
Orion's Belt with Alnitak on the left

The three belt stars were collectively known by many names in many cultures. Arabic terms include النجاد Al Nijād 'the Belt', النسك Al Nasak 'the Line', العلقات Al Alkāt 'the Golden Grains or Nuts' and, in modern Arabic, ميزان الحق Al Mīzān al Ḥaqq 'the Scale of Justice'. In Chinese mythology they were known as The Weighing Beam.

The belt was also the Three Stars mansion (simplified Chinese: 参宿; traditional Chinese: 參宿; pinyin: Shēn Xiù), one of the twenty-eight mansions of the Chinese constellations. It is one of the western mansions of the White Tiger.

In Chinese, 參宿 (Shēn Xiù), meaning Three Stars (asterism), refers to an asterism consisting of Alnitak, Alnilam and Mintaka (Orion's Belt), with Betelgeuse, Bellatrix, Saiph and Rigel later added. Consequently, the Chinese name for Alnitak is 參宿一 (Shēn Xiù yī, English: the First Star of Three Stars). It is one of the western mansions of the White Tiger.

== Namesakes ==
The USS Alnitah was a U.S. Navy Crater-class cargo ship named after the star.
