= Bellatrix =

Star in the constellation Orion

- Location of γ Orionis (circled)

Observation data Epoch J2000 Equinox ICRS
- Constellation: Orion
- Pronunciation: /ˈbɛlətrɪks/ /bɛˈleɪtrɪks/
- Right ascension: 05^{h} 25^{m} 07.86325^{s}
- Declination: +06° 20′ 58.9318″
- Apparent magnitude (V): 1.64 (1.59 - 1.64)

Characteristics
- Spectral type: B2III or B2V
- U−B color index: −0.86
- B−V color index: −0.21
- Variable type: Suspected

Astrometry
Radial velocity (R_{v})	+18.2 km/s
Proper motion (μ)	RA: −8.11 mas/yr Dec.: −12.88 mas/yr
Parallax (π)	12.92±0.52 mas
Distance	250 ± 10 ly (77 ± 3 pc)
Absolute magnitude (M_{V})	−2.78

Details
Mass	8.4 M_{☉}
Radius	6.2 R_{☉}
Luminosity	7,410 L_{☉}
Surface gravity (log g)	3.60 cgs
Temperature	22,017±220 K
Metallicity [Fe/H]	−0.07 dex
Rotational velocity (v sin i)	53.9±0.8 km/s
Age	28 Myr

Other designations
- Bellatrix, Al Najīd, Amazon Star, γ Orionis, Gamma Ori, γ Ori, 24 Ori, NSV 1972, BD+06°919, FK5 201, HD 35468, HIP 25336, HR 1790, SAO 112740

Database references
SIMBAD	data

Bellatrix is the third-brightest star in the constellation of Orion, positioned 5° west of the red supergiant Betelgeuse (Alpha Orionis). It has the Bayer designation γ Orionis, which is Latinized to Gamma Orionis. With a slightly variable magnitude of around 1.6, it is typically the 25th-brightest star in the night sky. At only 244.6 light-years from the Solar System, it is the closest major star in Orion.

== Nomenclature ==
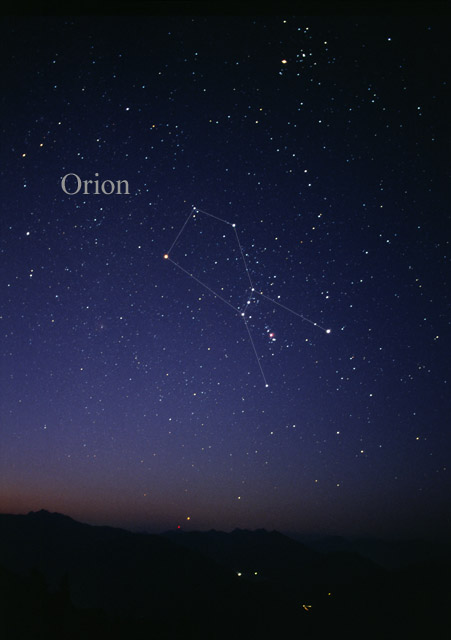
Bellatrix is a bright star in the constellation of Orion (top right).

The traditional name Bellatrix is from the Latin bellātrix "female warrior". It first appeared in the works of Abu Ma'shar al-Balkhi and Johannes Hispalensis, where it originally referred to Capella, but was transferred to Gamma Orionis by the Vienna school of astronomers in the 15th century, and appeared in contemporary reprints of the Alfonsine tables. In 2016, the International Astronomical Union organized a Working Group on Star Names (WGSN) to catalog and standardize proper names for stars. The WGSN's first bulletin of July 2016 included a table of the first two batches of names approved by the WGSN, which included Bellatrix for this star. It is now so entered in the IAU Catalog of Star Names. The designation of Bellatrix as γ Orionis (Latinized to Gamma Orionis) was made by Johann Bayer in 1603. The "gamma" designation is commonly given to the third-brightest star in each constellation.

== Standard star ==
Bellatrix has been used as both a photometric and spectral standard star, but both characteristics have been shown to be unreliable.

In 1963, Bellatrix was included with a set of bright stars used to define the UBV magnitude system. These are used for comparison with other stars to check for variability, and so by definition, the apparent magnitude of Bellatrix was set to 1.64. However, when an all-sky photometry survey was carried out in 1988, this star was suspected to be variable. It was measured ranging in apparent magnitude from 1.59 to 1.64, and appears to be a low amplitude, possibly irregular variable.

== Physical properties ==
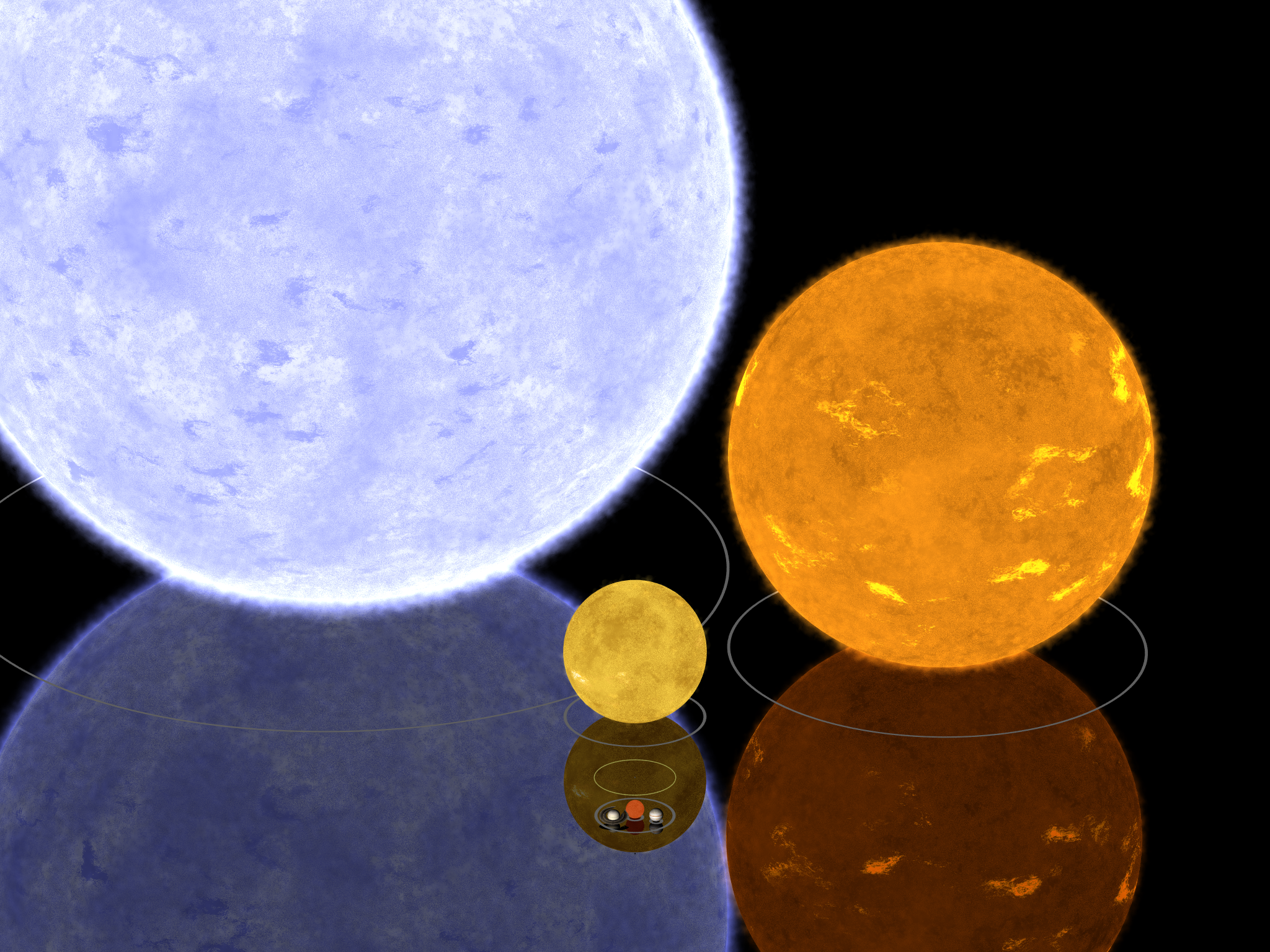
From left to right, the stars Bellatrix, the Sun, and Algol B

The spectral types for O and early B stars were defined more rigorously in 1971, and Bellatrix was used as a standard for the B2 III type. The expected brightness of Bellatrix from this spectral type is about one magnitude brighter than calculated from its apparent magnitude and Hipparcos distance. Analysis of the observed characteristics of the star indicate that it should be a B2 main sequence star, not the giant that it appears from its spectral type. Close analysis of high resolution spectra suggest that it is a spectroscopic binary composed of two similar stars less luminous than a B2 giant. However, direct observations based on interferometry confirm that Bellatrix is not a binary of similar-brightness stars, with an upper mass limit of 1.1 M_{☉} for any main sequence companion.

Bellatrix is a massive star with about 8.4 times the mass and 6.2 times the radius of the Sun. As a massive star, this star will evolve faster than the Sun. It currently has an estimated age of approximately 28 million years. The hydrogen should be exhausted in seven million years; after that, Bellatrix will expand and cool. It is one of the closest known core-collapse supernova candidates. The effective temperature of the outer envelope of this star is 22,000 K, which is considerably hotter than the 5,772 K on the Sun. This high temperature gives this star the blue-white hue that occurs with B-type stars. It shows a projected rotational velocity of around 52 km/s.

== Companions ==
Bellatrix was thought to belong to the Orion OB1 association of stars that share a common motion through space, along with the stars of Orion's Belt: Alnitak (Zeta Orionis), Alnilam (Epsilon Orionis), and Mintaka (Delta Orionis). However, this is no longer believed to be the case, as Bellatrix is now known to be much closer than the rest of the group. It is not known to have a stellar companion, although researchers Maria-Fernanda Nieva and Norbert Przybilla raised the possibility it might be a spectroscopic binary. A 2011 search for nearby companions failed to conclusively find any objects that share a proper motion with Bellatrix. Three nearby candidates were all found to be background stars.

Some researchers suspected that Bellatrix was a member of the 32 Orionis group. They proposed that the 32 Ori group should instead be termed the Bellatrix Cluster on the basis that the sky position and distance of Bellatrix are similar to those of the 32 Ori group. The proper motion of Bellatrix deviates significantly from the mean motion of the group, leaving its membership in question. However, it may be possible to reconcile membership if the divergent velocity is the result of an unseen companion. For example, a face-on orbit with a black hole companion orbiting ~100 AU from the star with a period measured in centuries could account for the discrepancy.

A search for close companions using interferometry in the K band has not revealed any stars with a K-band luminosity greather than 1% that of Bellatrix.

== Etymology and cultural significance ==
Bellatrix was also called the Amazon Star, which Richard Hinckley Allen proposed came from a loose translation of the Arabic name Al Najīd, the Conqueror. A c.1275 Arabic celestial globe records the name as المرزم "the lion". Bellatrix is one of the four navigational stars in Orion that are used for celestial navigation.

In the 17th century catalogue of stars in the Calendarium of Al Achsasi al Mouakket, this star was designated Menkib al Jauza al Aisr, which was translated into Latin as Humerus Sinister Gigantis (The Left Shoulder of the Giant).

The Wardaman people of northern Australia know Bellatrix as Banjan, the sparkling pigment used in ceremonies conducted by Rigel the Red Kangaroo Leader in a songline when Orion is high in the sky. The other stars of Orion are his ceremonial tools and entourage. Betelgeuse is Ya-jungin "Owl Eyes Flicking", watching the ceremonies.

To the Inuit, the appearance of Betelgeuse and Bellatrix high in the southern sky after sunset marked the beginning of spring and lengthening days in late February and early March. The two stars were known as Akuttujuuk "those (two) placed far apart", referring to the distance between them, mainly to people from North Baffin Island and Melville Peninsula.

== See also ==
- List of brightest stars
- List of nearest bright stars
- Historical brightest stars
- List of supernova candidates
