= Alnilam =

Star in the constellation Orion, in the center of the Orion's Belt

- Location of Alnilam (circled)

Observation data Epoch J2000 Equinox ICRS
- Constellation: Orion
- Pronunciation: /ælˈnaɪlæm/
- Right ascension: 05^{h} 36^{m} 12.81^{s}
- Declination: −01° 12′ 06.9″
- Apparent magnitude (V): 1.69 (1.64–1.74)

Characteristics
- Evolutionary stage: Blue supergiant
- Spectral type: B0 Ia
- U−B color index: −1.03
- B−V color index: −0.18
- Variable type: α Cygni

Astrometry
Radial velocity (R_{v})	25.9 km/s
Proper motion (μ)	RA: 1.49 mas/yr Dec.: −1.06 mas/yr
Parallax (π)	1.65±0.45 mas
Distance	1,250±26 ly (384±8 pc)
Absolute magnitude (M_{V})	−6.89

Details
Mass	28.4±2.0 M_{☉}
Radius	33.6±1.8 (equatorial) R_{☉} 22.3±1.2 (polar) R_{☉}
Luminosity	271,000±38,000 L_{☉}
Surface gravity (log g)	3.01±0.10 cgs
Temperature	25,000±1,000 K
Rotation	4.27+1.00 −0.00 days
Rotational velocity (v sin i)	220+40 −100 km/s
Age	4.47 Myr

Other designations
- Alnilam, TD1 4963, ε Ori, 46 Orionis, Orionis, BD−01°969, FK5 210, HD 37128, HIP 26311, HR 1903, SAO 132346, 參宿二

Database references
SIMBAD	data

Alnilam is the central star of Orion's Belt in the equatorial constellation of Orion. It has the Bayer designation ε Orionis, which is Latinised to Epsilon Orionis and abbreviated Epsilon Ori or ε Ori. This is a massive, blue supergiant star some 1,250 light-years distant. It is estimated to be 270,000 times as luminous as the Sun, and 28 times as massive.

== Observation ==
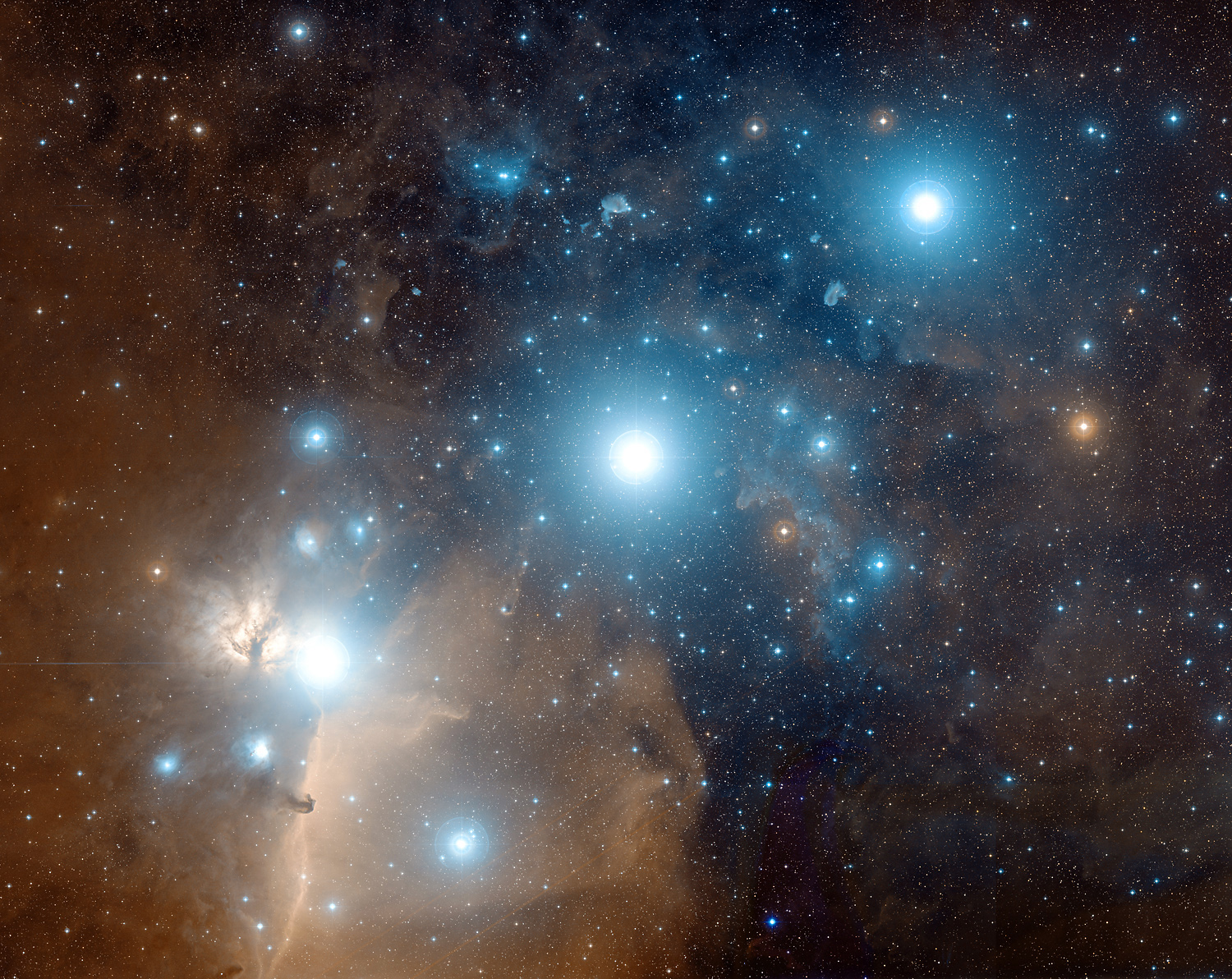
Alnilam is the middle and brightest of the three stars of Orion's Belt.

It is the 29th-brightest star in the sky (the fourth brightest in Orion) and is a blue supergiant. Together with Mintaka and Alnitak, the three stars make up Orion's Belt, known by many names across many ancient cultures. Alnilam is the middle star.

Since 1943, the spectrum of this star has served as one of the stable anchor points by which other stars are classified, for the spectral class B0Ia. Although the spectrum shows variations, particularly in the H-alpha absorption lines, this is considered typical for this type of luminous hot supergiant. It is also one of the 58 stars used in celestial navigation. It is at its highest point in the sky around midnight on December 15.

It is slightly variable, from magnitude 1.64 to magnitude 1.74, with no clear period, and it is classified as an α Cygni variable. Its spectrum also varies, possibly due to unpredictable changes in mass loss from the surface.

== Physical characteristics ==
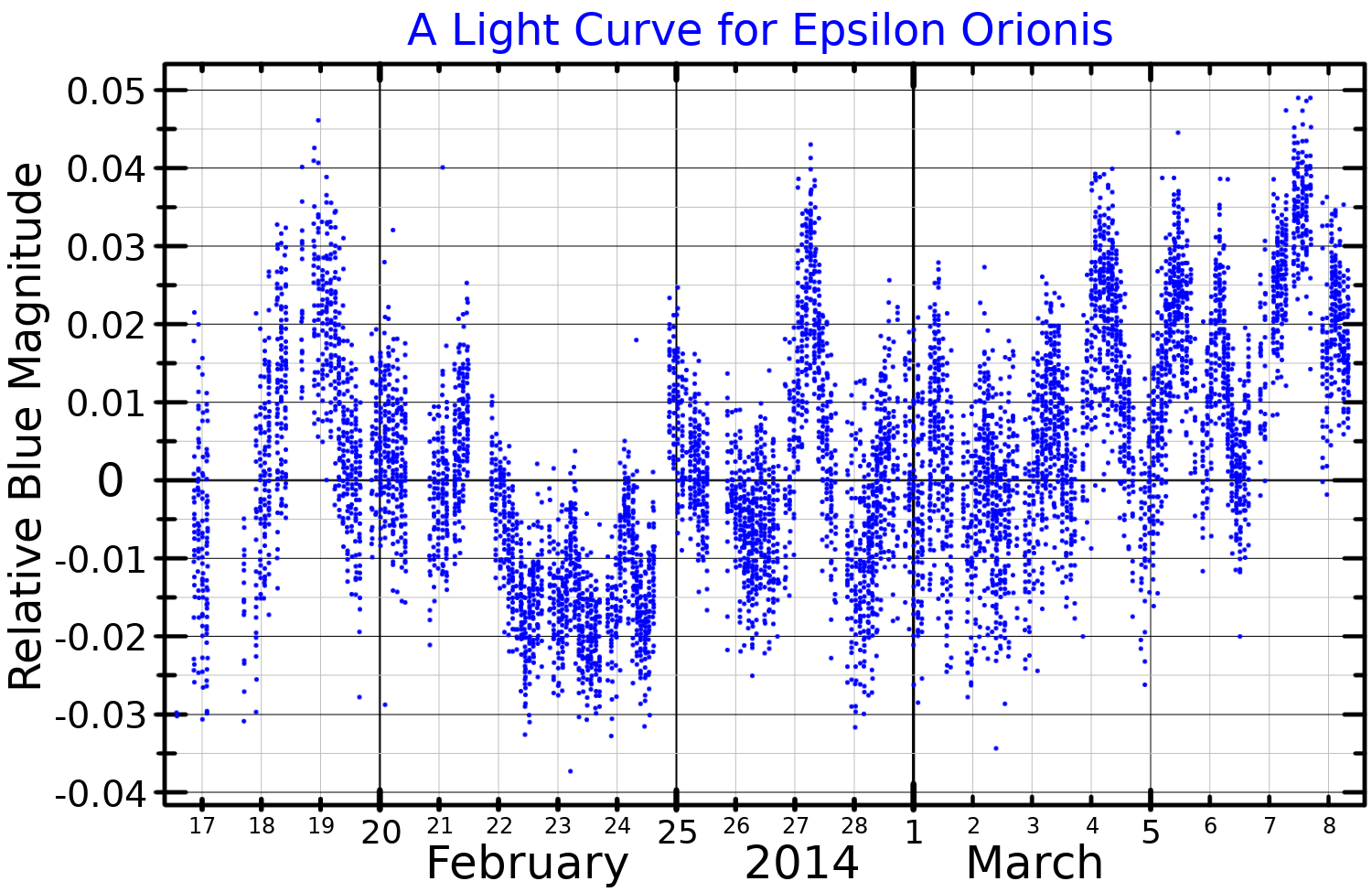
A blue band light curve for Epsilon Orionis, adapted from Krtička and Feldmeier (2018)

Estimates of Alnilam's properties vary. Crowther and colleagues, using stellar wind and atmospheric modelling in 2006, came up with a luminosity 275,000 times that of the Sun (L_{☉}), an effective temperature of 27,000 K and a radius 24 times that of the Sun (R_{☉}). Searle and colleagues, using CMFGEN code to analyse the spectrum in 2008, calculated a luminosity of 537,000 L_{☉}, an effective temperature of 27,500 ± 100 K and a radius of 32.4 ± 0.75 R_{☉}. Analysis of the spectra and age of the members of the Orion OB1 association yields a current mass 34.6 times that of the Sun, initial mass of 40.8 M_{☉}, and an age of 5.7 million years.

A more detailed analysis from 2015 across multiple wavelength bands produced very high luminosity, radius and mass estimates, assuming the distance of 606 parsecs suggested by the Hipparcos new reduction. Adopting the larger parallax from the original Hipparcos reduction gives a distance of 412 parsecs and physical parameters more consistent with earlier publications. The luminosity of 832,000 L_{☉} and the mass of 64.5 M_{☉} at 606 parsecs is the highest ever derived for this star. However, the Hipparcos distance later turned out to be incorrect. Using precalculated models, a 2020 study found smaller values for luminosity (420,000 L_{☉}), radius (30.61 R_{☉}) and mass (40 M_{☉}). Another spectroscopic distance modulus of 7.79 imply a distance of 361 parsecs.

Interferometric observations in 2025 with the Very Large Telescope have uncovered that Alnilam is a fast rotator being viewed at low inclination. It has an oblate shape, with an equatorial circumference that is 51% larger than the polar circumference, which at a distance of 384±8 pc results in polar and equatorial radii of 22.3 and 33.6 R_{☉}. Rotating close to its breakup velocity, Alnilam's fast rotation suggests it formed after the merger of two stars in a binary system.

Alnilam's relatively simple spectrum has made it useful for studying the interstellar medium. It is surrounded by a molecular cloud, NGC 1990, which it illuminates to make a reflection nebula. Its stellar winds may reach up to 2,000 km/s, causing it to lose mass about 20 million times more rapidly than the Sun.

== Nomenclature and history ==
ε Orionis is the star's Bayer designation and 46 Orionis its Flamsteed designation.

The traditional name Alnilam derives from the Arabic النظام al-niẓām 'arrangement/string (of pearls)'. Related spellings are Alnihan and Alnitam: all three variants are evidently mistakes in transliteration or copy errors, the first perhaps due to confusion with النيلم al-nilam 'the sapphire'. In 2016, the International Astronomical Union organized a Working Group on Star Names (WGSN) to catalog and standardize proper names for stars. The WGSN's first bulletin of July 2016 included a table of the first two batches of names approved by the WGSN; which included Alnilam for this star. It is now so entered in the IAU Catalog of Star Names.

=== Orion's Belt ===
The three belt stars were collectively known by many names in many cultures. Arabic terms include Al Nijād ('the Belt'), Al Nasak ('the Line'), Al Alkāt ('the Golden Grains or Nuts') and, in modern Arabic, Al Mīzān al H•akk ('the Accurate Scale Beam'). In Chinese mythology, they were also known as the Weighing Beam.

In Chinese, 參宿 (Shēn Sù), meaning "three stars," refers to the asterism consisting of Orion's belt (Alnilam, Alnitak and Mintaka), with four other stars (Betelgeuse, Bellatrix, Saiph and Rigel) later added. It is one of the western mansions of the White Tiger. Consequently, the Chinese name for Alnilam is 參宿二 (Shēn Sù èr, English: the Second Star of the Three Stars).

== See also ==
- List of most massive stars
