= YSO 244-440 =

Massive young stellar object in the Orion constellation

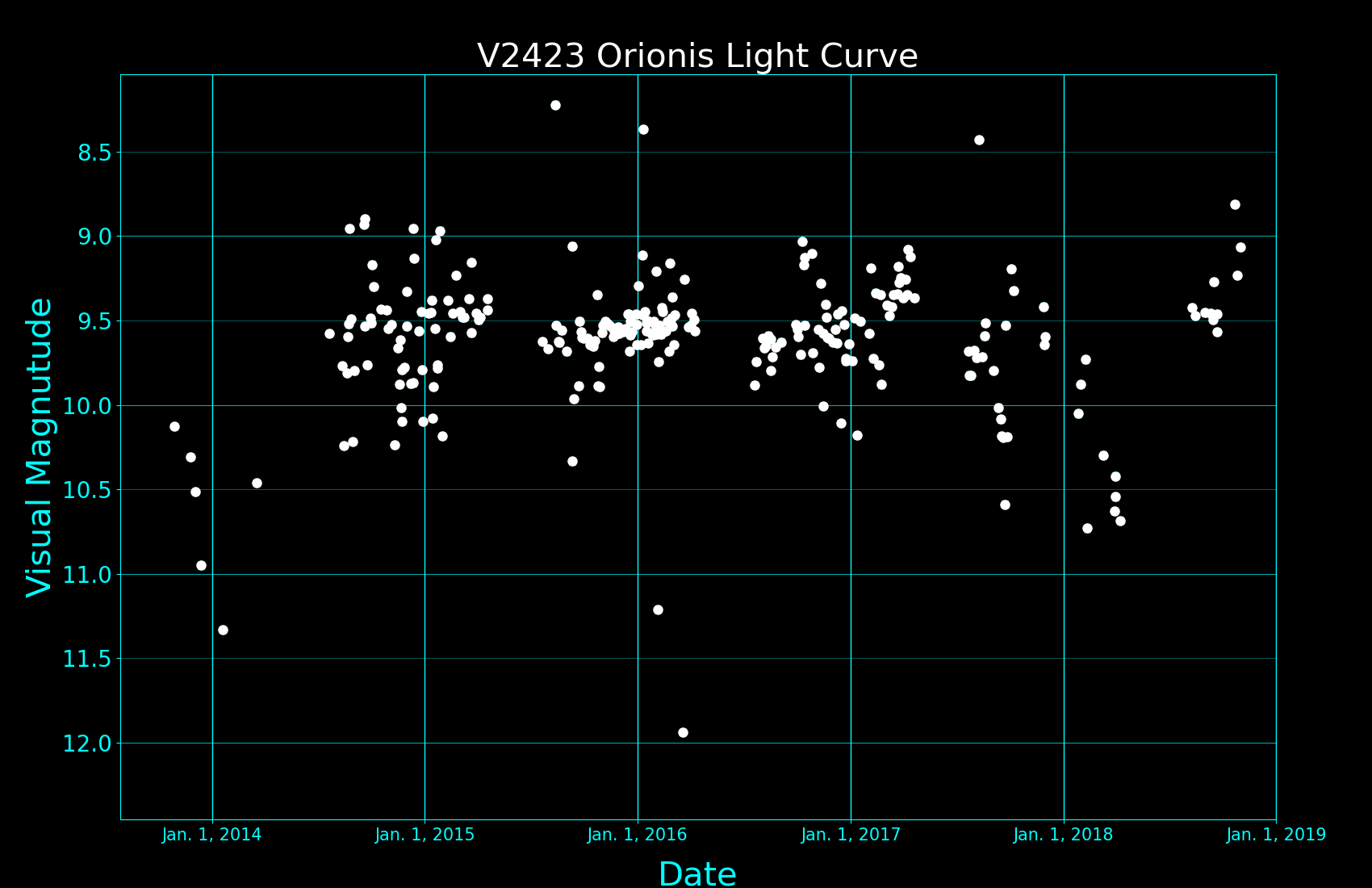
- Light curve for V2423 Orionis plotted from ASAS-SN data

Observation data Epoch J2000 Equinox ICRS
- Constellation: Orion
- Right ascension: 05^{h} 35^{m} 24.44^{s}
- Declination: −05° 24′ 39.9″

Characteristics

Astrometry
Distance	1,300 ly (400 pc)

Details

A
Mass	0.5 M_{☉}
Age	0.1-0.2 Myr

B
Mass	<0.2 M_{☉}
Age	0.1-0.2 Myr

Other designations
- Stellar sprinkler, 2MASS J05352443-0524398, AP J05352443-0524398, Brun 687, COUP 1290, COUP J053524.4-052439, CXOONC J053524.4-052440, HH 524, ISOY J053524.43-052439.9, JW 756, MAX 181, MLLA 164, TIC 427395014, V2423 Ori

Database references
SIMBAD	data

YSO 244-440 (also nicknamed the Stellar Sprinkler) is a binary system of young stellar objects (YSO) located 1,300 light years from Earth in the constellation of Orion. The two objects have an orbital separation of 30-40 AU. The larger object has a mass of about 0.5 solar masses while the smaller object orbiting it has a mass of around <0.2 solar masses. It has an age of roughly 0.1-0.2 million years old. It is a giant proplyd with a radius of approximately 1,400 AU across making it one of the largest proplyds in the Orion Nebula Cluster (ONC).

The system has a bipolar jet with a noticeable S-shape morphology. The morphology of the jets is from the material being launched from the smaller star orbiting the larger. Another factor in the shape of the bipolar jet is the strong amounts of radiation produced by the stars.
