= Sh 2-279 =

Emission nebula in the constellation Orion

Sh-279
Nebula
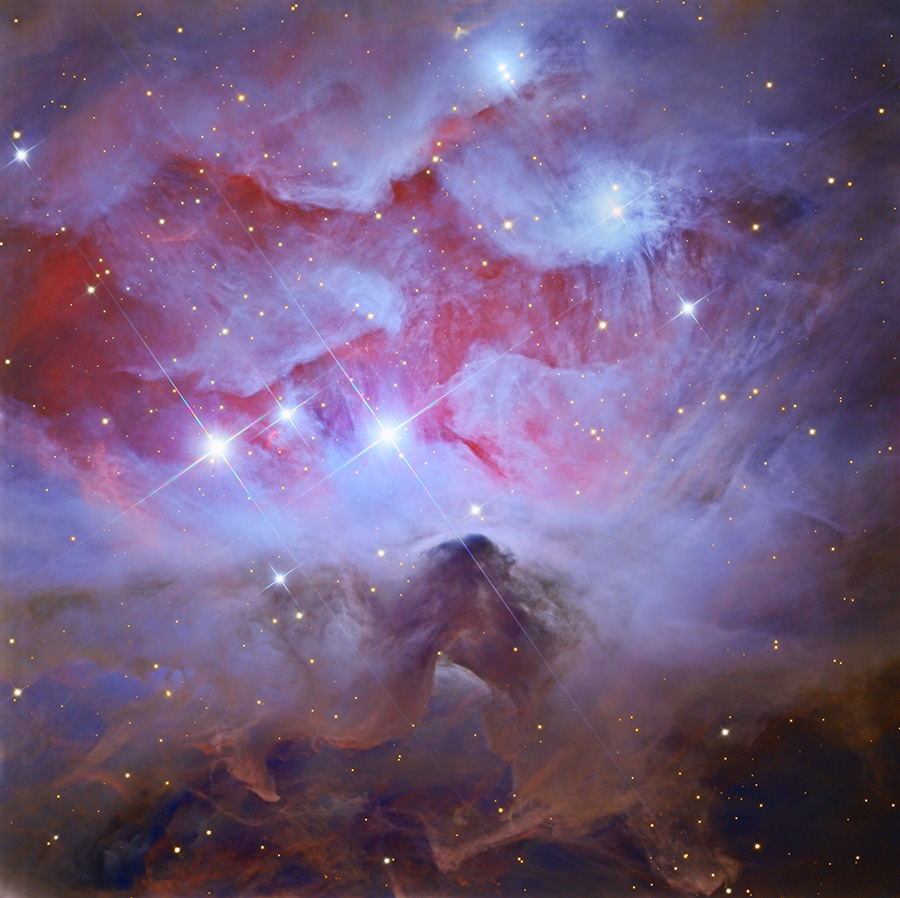
- Sh-279 as taken from the Mount Lemmon Observatory

Observation data: J2000.0 epoch
- Right ascension: 05^{h} 35^{m} 16.2^{s}
- Declination: −04° 47′ 07″
- Distance: 1,500 ly
- Apparent magnitude (V): 7.0
- Apparent dimensions (V): 20′ × 10′
- Constellation: Orion

Physical characteristics
- Radius: ~7.5 ly (1977), 2 ly (1975); 1 ly (1973) ly
- Designations: Sh-279, NGC 1977-73-75

Sh 2-279 is an HII region and bright nebulae that includes a reflection nebula located in the constellation Orion. Alternatively, it is designated S279 or Sharpless 279. This feature is the northernmost part of the asterism known as Orion's Sword, lying 0.6° north of the Orion Nebula. The reflection nebula embedded in Sh 2-279 is popularly known as the Running Man Nebula.

== Description ==
Sh 2-279 comprises three NGC nebulae, NGC 1973, NGC 1975, and NGC 1977 that are divided by darker nebulous regions. It also includes the open cluster NGC 1981. The brightest nebulosity, later listed as NGC 1977 (also commonly known today as the Mermaid's Purse Nebula), was discovered by William Herschel in 1786. He catalogued it as "H V 30" and described "!! 42 Orionis and neb[ula]". The two smaller reflection nebulae were first noted by German astronomer Heinrich Louis d'Arrest, NGC 1973 in 1862 and NGC 1975 in 1864. All three were included in the New General Catalogue in 1888. The designation NGC 1977 is used in various sources for the reflection area around 42 Orionis (the south-east portion of the reflection nebula), for the entire reflection nebula (including NGC 1973 and NGC 1975), or for the whole nebula complex.

This whole region in Orion's Sword was also later catalogued as Orion 1c. In 1966, van den Bergh distinguished the weak clustering of reflection nebulae that includes Sh 2-279 as Ori R2. Every reflection nebula appearing within the Sharpless catalogue was first identified on blue plates of the Palomar Sky Survey, and then double checked against the red plates to eliminate possible plate faults. Van den Berg found that there was a strong concentration of new T Tauri stars around the Orion Nebula, tapering off into a tail approaching Sh 2-279.

The Running Man Nebula is a popular target for amateur astrophotographers, as it lies close to the Orion Nebula and has many nearby guide stars. The outline of the running man shows up primarily in photographs; it is difficult to perceive visually through telescopes, though the reflection nebula itself is visible in small to medium apertures in dark skies.

== Ionization Source ==
The whole reflection nebula region is likely excited by the hot young star (YSO) called c Orionis, 42 Orionis or HD 37018 in NGC 1977, which appears as a 4.6 magnitude star some 3.8′ from the centre of Sh 2-279. (See image box.) Other massive stars include the yellow giant 45 Orionis and the variable KX Orionis.

== Proplyds in NGC 1977 ==
One candidate proplyd was discovered in NGC 1977 with the Hubble Space Telescope in 2012. The object showed a bent protostellar jet and a possible ionization front facing 42 Orionis, suggesting it is a proplyd. In 2016 a group of astronomers discovered six proplyds with the Hubble Space Telescope and one proplyd with the Spitzer Space Telescope. The proplyds are pointing to the B-star 42 Orionis, which is the main source of ultraviolet radiation in this region. This ultraviolet light is photoevaporating the proto-planetary disks and the stellar wind of 42 Orionis is shaping the gas into cometary tails. Proplyds were first discovered in large numbers in the Orion Nebula, but there the ultraviolet source responsible for the photoevaporation is the O-type star Theta^{1} Orionis C. 42 Orionis is the first instance of a B-type star being responsible for the photoevaporation.

All proplyds in NGC 1977 lie within 0.3 parsec of 42 Orionis and two have resolved central sources in the Hubble images, which might be the disks with radii of about 70 and 48 astronomical units.

The proplyds were studied with JWST MIRI. The closest disk (KCFF#1) is experiencing extreme mass loss, as traced by an 8000 au dusty tail. It lacks any compact hydrogen gas. KCFF#2 does show extended hydrogen, argon and neon emission.

NGC 1977 also includes the young star Parengo 2042 (P 2042).

== Image gallery ==
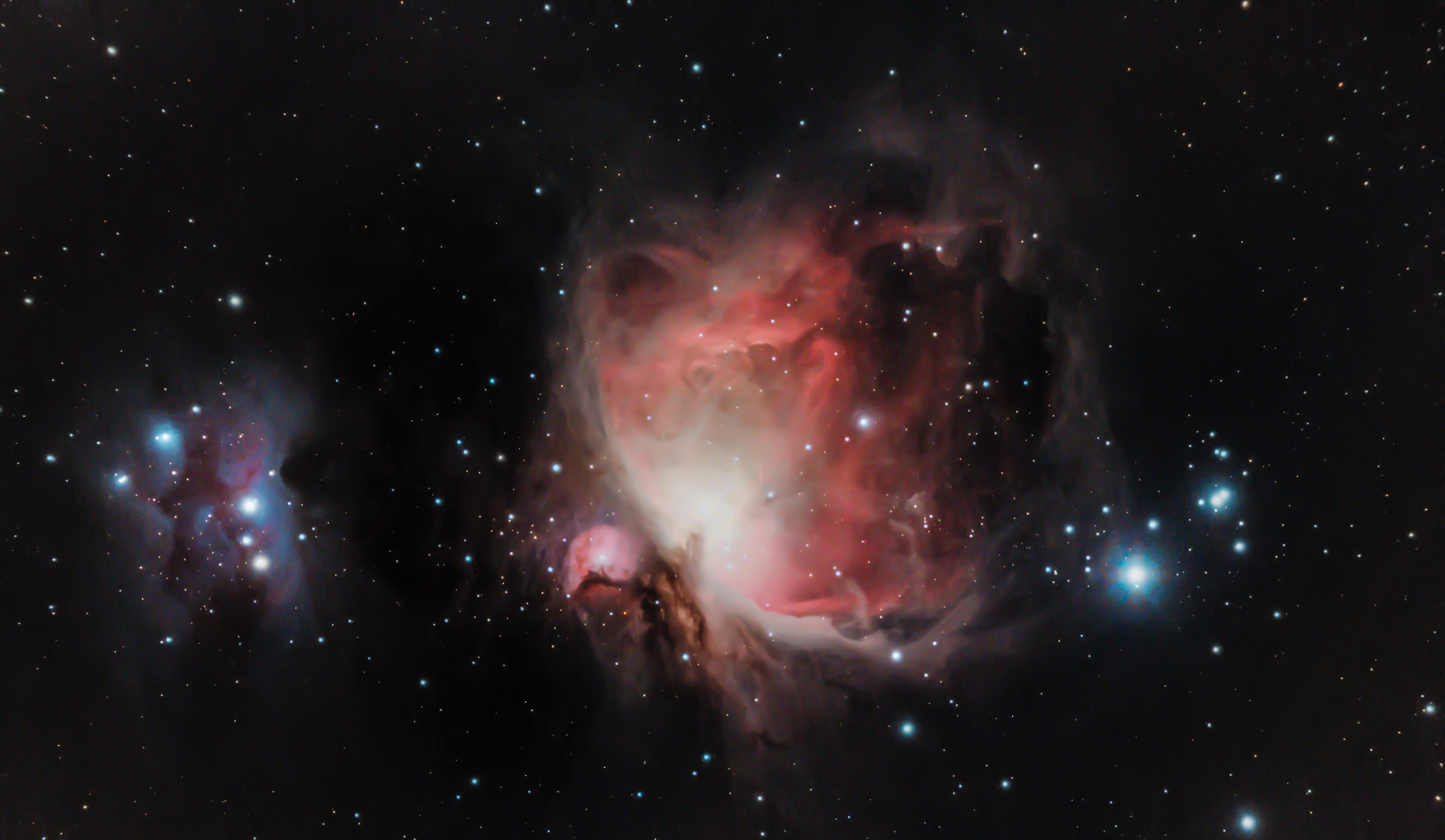
Image of the Running Man nebula and its proximity to the Orion nebula.

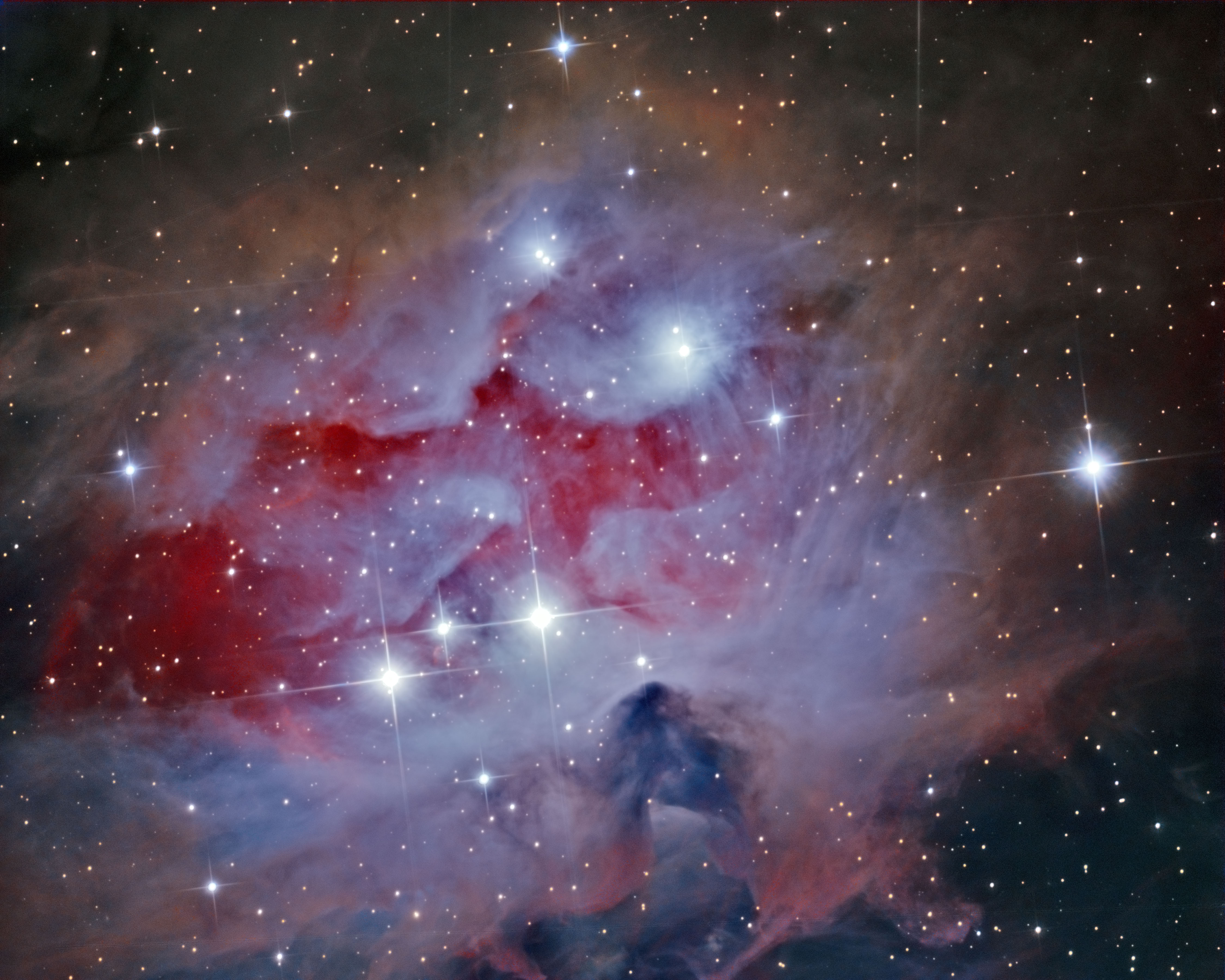
NGC 1977, Running Man Nebula, by W4SM using 17" PlaneWave CDK, Louisa, VA

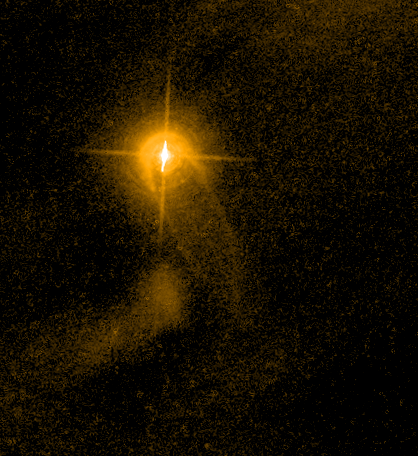
Largest proplyd in NGC 1977 seen by Hubble

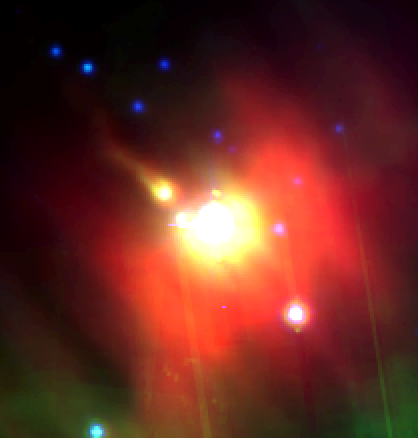
Proplyd imaged by the Spitzer Space Telescope is the elongated object on the upper left. 42 Orionis is in the middle and it is surrounded by glowing dust.

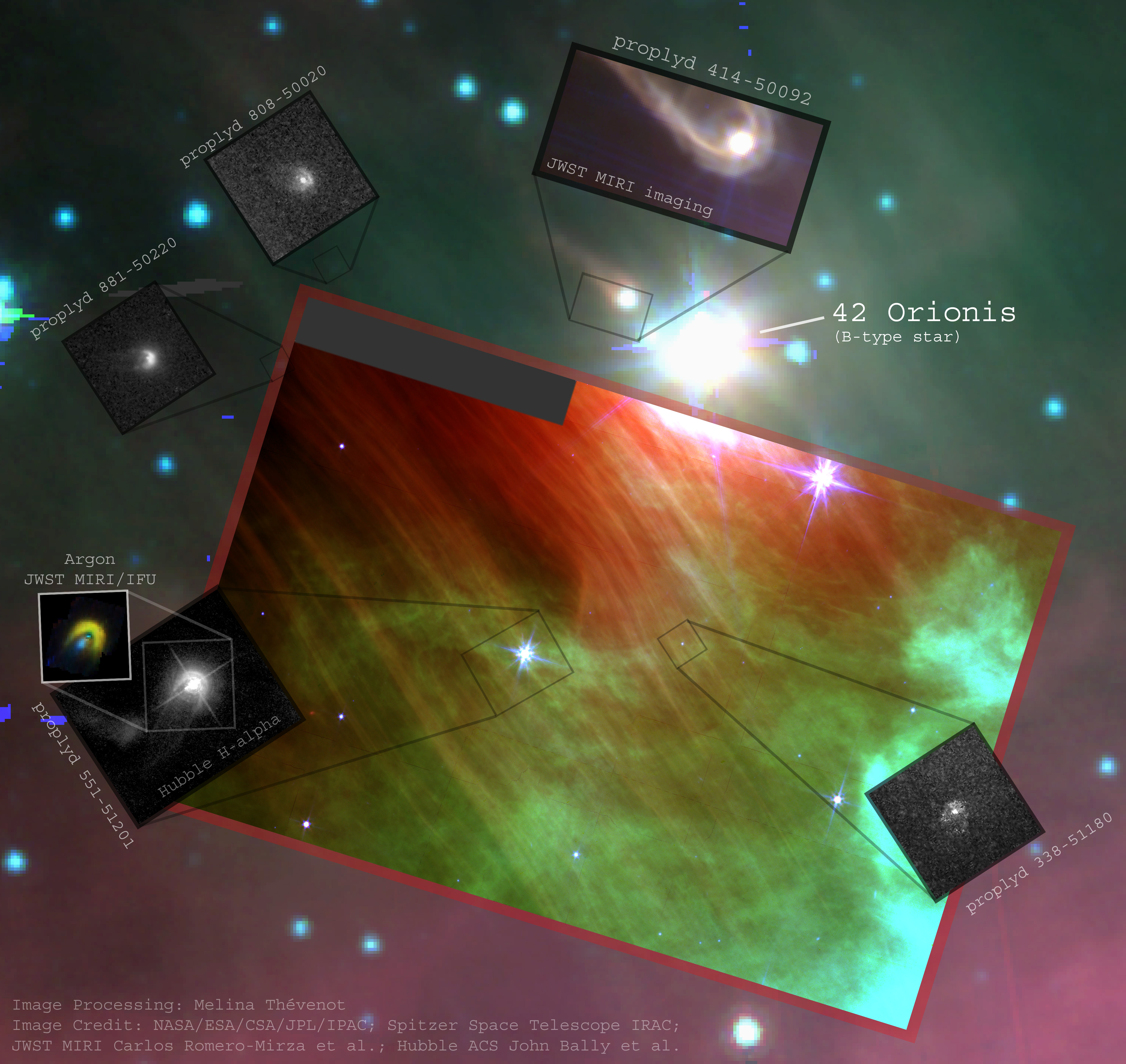
Proplyds around 42 Orionis with Spitzer, JWST and Hubble
