= NGC 2244 =

Open cluster within the Rosette nebula, in the constellation Monoceros

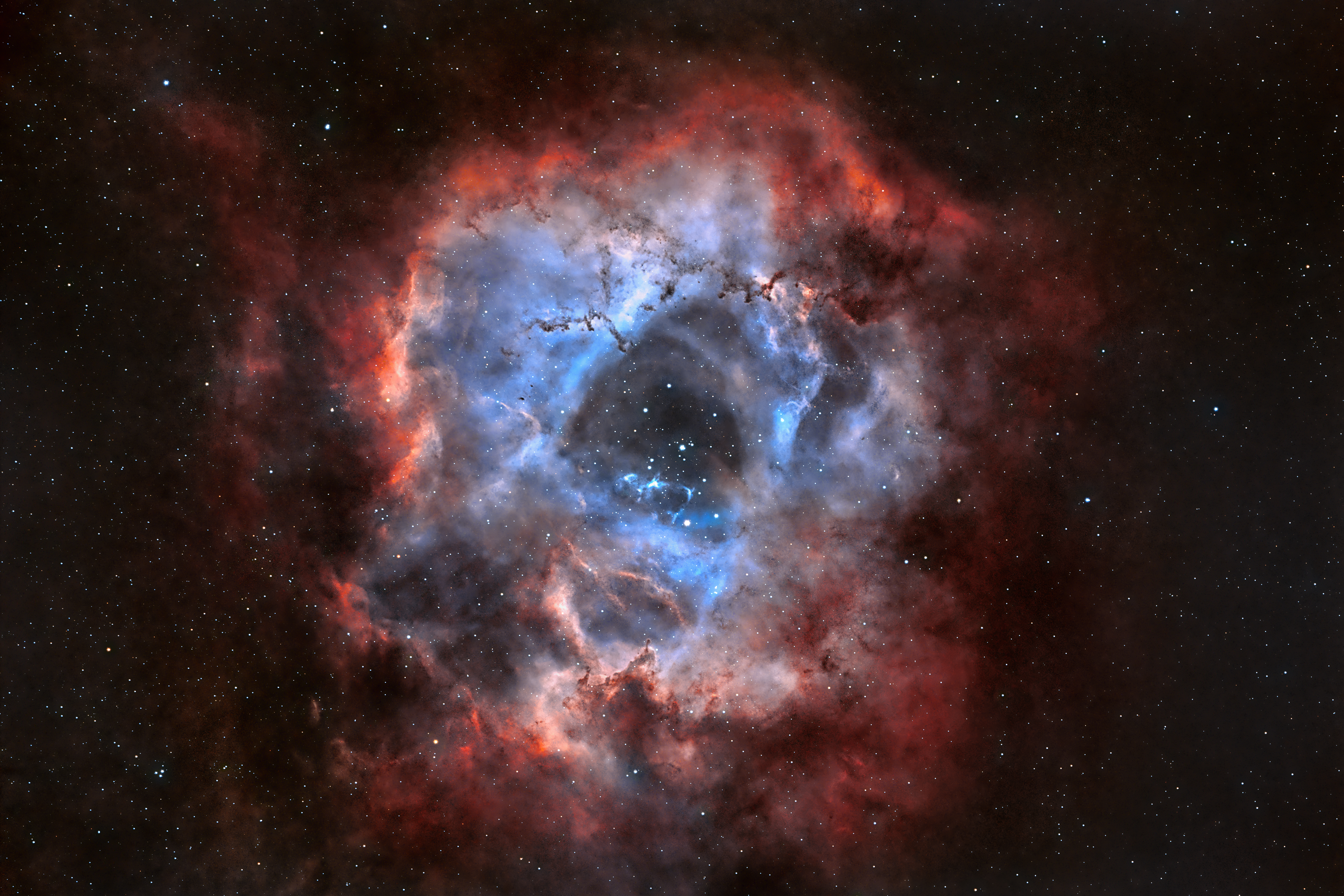
- Image of NGC 2244 located within Rosette Nebula

Observation data (J2000 epoch)
- Right ascension: 6^{h} 31^{m} 54^{s}
- Declination: +4° 56′
- Distance: 5.2 kly (1.6 kpc) kly
- Apparent magnitude (V): 4.8
- Apparent dimensions (V): 24′

Physical characteristics
- Radius: 18 ly
- Other designations: Caldwell 50, Satellite Cluster, NGC 2239, Cr 99

Associations
- Constellation: Monoceros

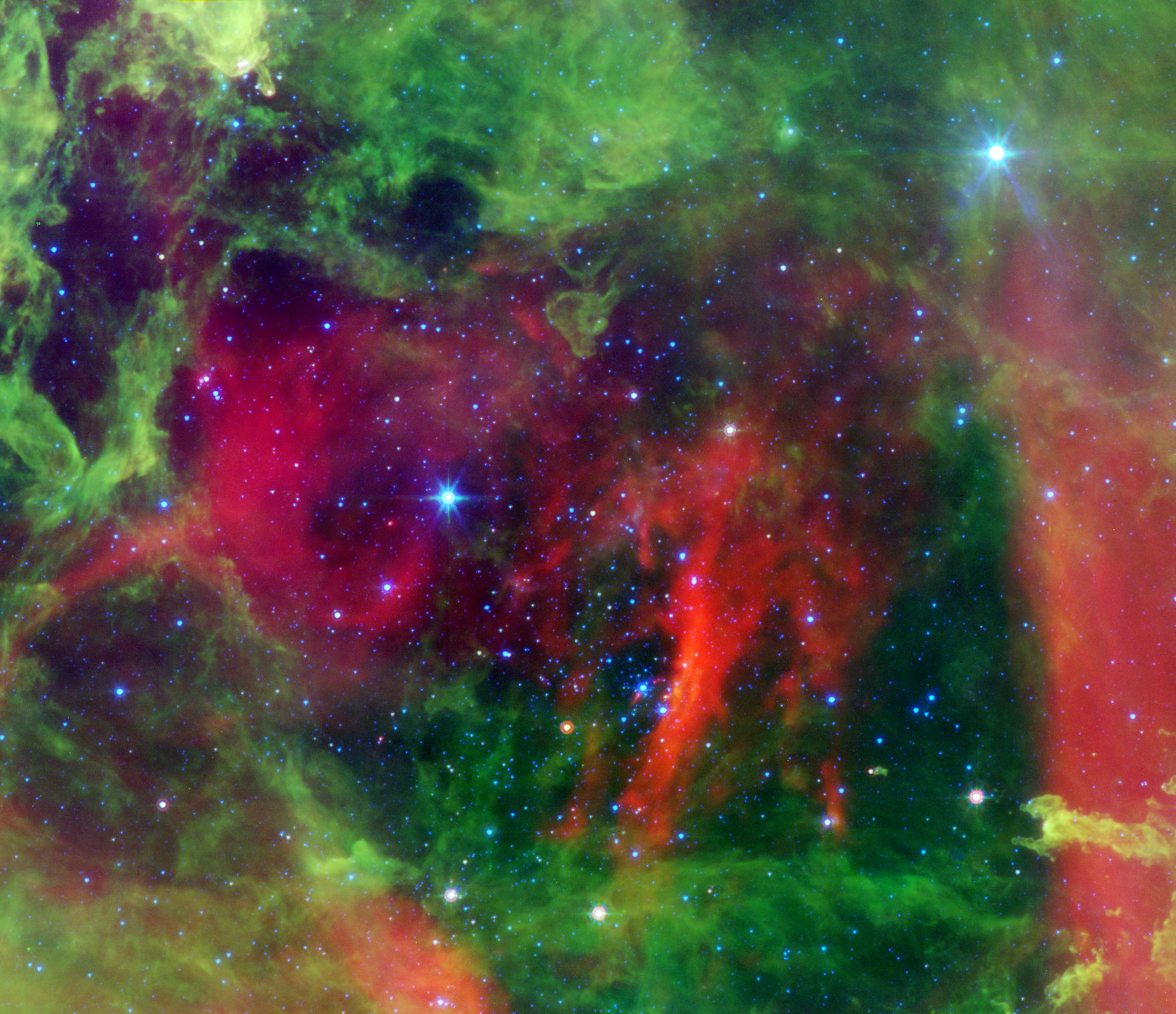
An infrared Spitzer Space Telescope (SIRT) image of NGC 2244. Credit: SIRT/NASA

NGC 2244 is an open cluster of stars in the Rosette Nebula, which is located in the constellation Monoceros. Alternatively, it is known as Caldwell 50 or the Satellite Cluster. This cluster has several O-type stars, super hot stars that generate large amounts of radiation and stellar wind.

The age of this cluster has been estimated to be less than 5 million years. The brightest star in the direction of the cluster is 12 Monocerotis, a foreground K-class giant. The two brightest members of the cluster are HD 46223 of spectral class O4V, 400,000 times brighter than the Sun, and approximately 50 times more massive, and HD 46150, whose spectral type is O5V, has a luminosity 450,000 time larger than that of our star, and is up to 60 times more massive, but it may actually be a double star. These stars do not seem to pulsate, which is in agreement with stellar modeling of stars with similar global parameters.

A study from 2023 found that brown dwarfs in NGC 2244 form closer to OB-stars than to other stars. This could be explained by the photoevaporation of the outer layers of prestellar cores that otherwise would form low-mass stars or intermediate mass stars. The study also found a low disk fraction for low-mass objects of 39%±9% for objects later than K0. One cluster member was discovered in the past to show signs of an eroding disk, reminiscent of a proplyd.

== See also ==
- List of most massive stars
