= Proplyd =

Dust ring surrounding large stars thousands of solar radii wide

Proplyds in the Orion Nebula

A proplyd, short for ionized protoplanetary disk, is an externally illuminated photoevaporating protoplanetary disk around a young star. Nearly 180 proplyds have been discovered in the Orion Nebula. Images of proplyds in other star-forming regions are rare, while Orion is the only region with a large known sample due to its relative proximity to Earth.

== History ==
In 1979 observations with the Lallemand electronic camera at the Pic-du-Midi Observatory showed six unresolved high-ionization sources near the Trapezium Cluster. These sources were not interpreted as proplyds, but as partly ionized globules (PIGs). The idea was that these objects are being ionized from the outside by M42. Later observations with the Very Large Array showed solar-system-sized condensations associated with these sources. Here the idea appeared that these objects might be low-mass stars surrounded by an evaporating protostellar accretion disk.

Proplyds were clearly resolved in 1993 using images of the Hubble Space Telescope Wide Field Camera and the term "proplyd" was used.

== Characteristics ==
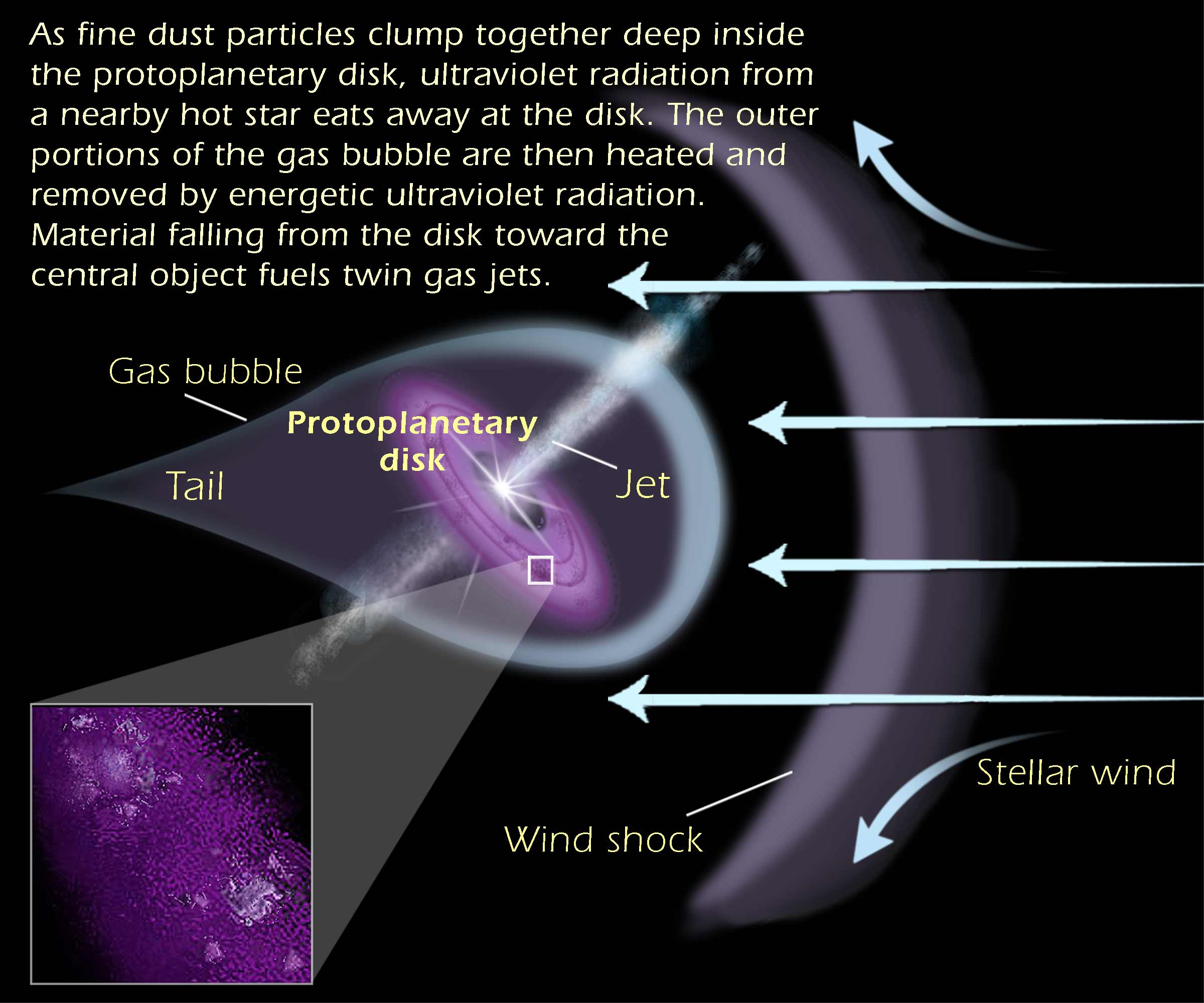
Illustration of the dynamics of a proplyd, including an astrophysical jet

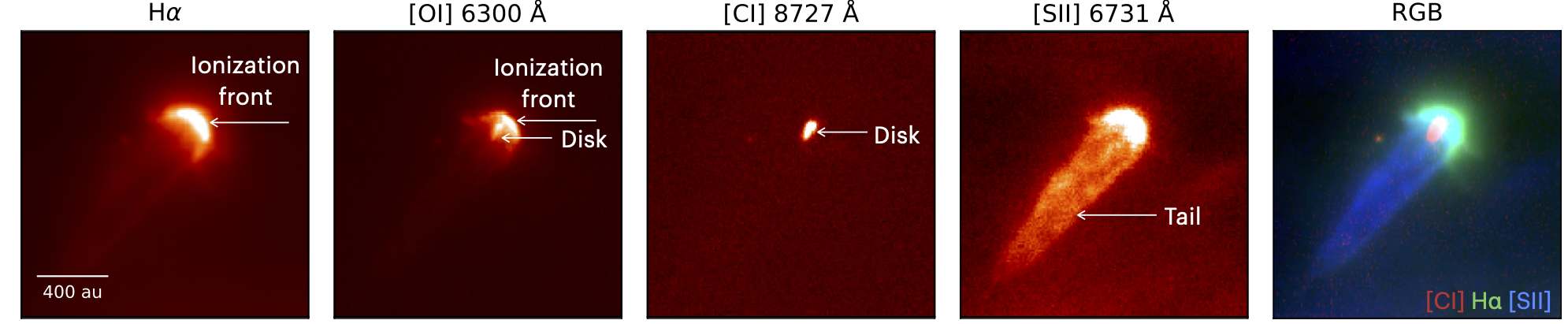
Components of proplyd 177-341W in the Orion Nebula observed with VLT MUSE, showing an ionization front, protoplanetary disk, and tail

In the Orion Nebula the proplyds observed are usually one of two types. Some proplyds glow around luminous stars, in cases where the disk is found close to the star, glowing from the star's luminosity. Other proplyds are found at a greater distance from the host star and instead show up as dark silhouettes due to the self-obscuration of cooler dust and gases from the disk itself. Some proplyds show signs of movement from solar irradiance shock waves pushing the proplyds. The Orion Nebula is approximately 1,500 light-years from the Sun with very active star formation. The Orion Nebula and the Sun are in the same spiral arm of the Milky Way galaxy.

A proplyd may form new planets and planetesimal systems. Current models show that the metallicity of the star and proplyd, along with the correct planetary system temperature and distance from the star, are keys to planet and planetesimal formation. To date, the Solar System, with 8 planets, 5 dwarf planets and 5 planetesimal systems, is the largest planetary system found. Most proplyds develop into a system with no planetesimal systems, or into one very large planetesimal system.

== Proplyds in other star-forming regions ==
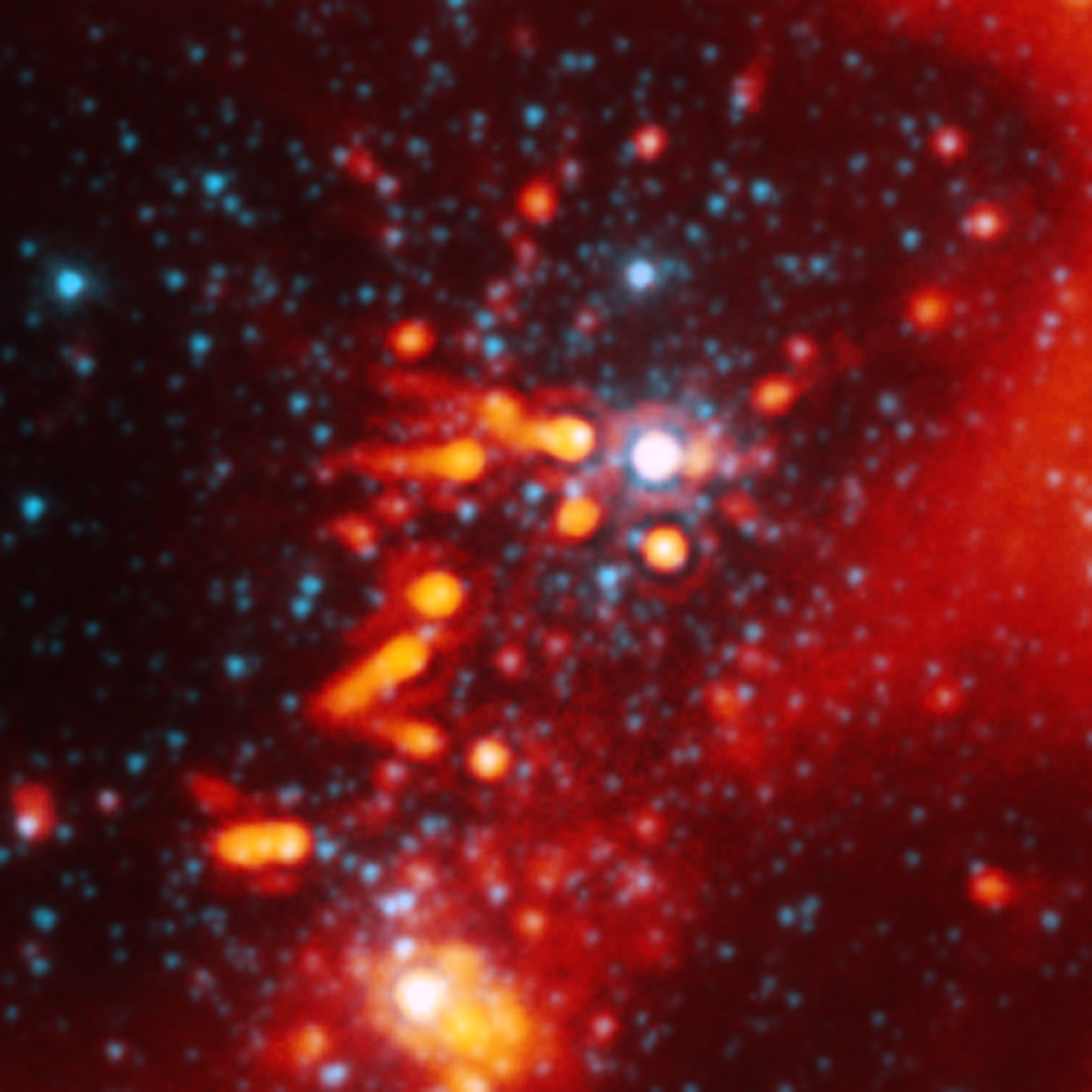
Dusty proplyds pointing to HD 17505 in Westerhout 5 as seen by the Spitzer Space Telescope

Photoevaporating proplyds in other star forming regions were found with the Hubble Space Telescope. NGC 1977 currently represents the star-forming region with the largest number of proplyds outside of the Orion Nebula, with 7 confirmed proplyds. It was also the first instance where a B-type star, 42 Orionis is responsible for the photoevaporation. In addition, 4 clear and 4 candidate proplyds were discovered in the very young region NGC 2024, two of which have been photoevaporated by a B star. The NGC 2024 proplyds are significant because they imply that external photoevaporation of protoplanetary disks could compete even with very early planet formation (within the first half a million years).

Another type of photoevaporating proplyd was discovered with the Spitzer Space Telescope. These cometary tails represent dust being pulled away from the disks. Westerhout 5 is a region with many dusty proplyds, especially around HD 17505. These dusty proplyds are depleted of any gas in the outer regions of the disk, but the photoevaporation could leave an inner, more robust, and possibly gas-rich disk component of radius 5-10 astronomical units.

The proplyds in the Orion Nebula and other star-forming regions represent proto-planetary disks around low-mass stars being externally photoevaporated. These low-mass proplyds are usually found within 0.3 parsec (60,000 astronomical units) of the massive OB star and the dusty proplyds have tails with a length of 0.1 to 0.2 parsec (20,000 to 40,000 au). There is a proposed type of intermediate massive counterpart, called proplyd-like objects. Objects in NGC 3603 and later in Cygnus OB2 were proposed as intermediate massive versions of the bright proplyds found in the Orion Nebula. The proplyd-like objects in Cygnus OB2 for example are 6 to 14 parsec distant to a large collection of OB stars and have tail lengths of 0.11 to 0.55 parsec (24,000 to 113,000 au). The nature of proplyd-like objects as intermediate massive proplyds is partly supported by a spectrum for one object, which showed that the mass loss rate is higher than the mass accretion rate. Another object did not show any outflow, but accretion.

=== List of star-forming regions with proplyds ===
List is sorted after distance.

Star-Forming region (SFR)	example image	Distance (light-years)	Age of SFR (Myrs)	Ionizing stars	spectral type of ionizing stars	Number of proplyds	type of proplyd	References
NGC 1977		1305	4	42 Orionis	B1V	7	gaseous + dusty tails	
Lambda Orionis Cluster		1305	6	Meissa	O8IIIf+B0.5V	2	dusty tails	
Orion Nebula		1344	1	Theta1 Orionis C	O6Vp+B0V	178	gaseous + dark disks	
Messier 43		1300	1	NU Orionis (HD 37061)	B0.5V	3	gaseous	
Flame Nebula		1350	0.2 to 0.5	IRS1, IRS2b	B0.5V, O8V	4 or 8	gaseous	
NGC 2264		2609	4	S Mon	O7Ve	1	dusty tails	
IC 1396		2723	3	HD 206267	O6V	1	dusty tails	
NGC 6193		3783	5	HD 150136, CD-48 11071	O3.5-4III(f*)+O6IV, B0V	8 or 9	dusty tails	
Cygnus OB2		4566	3-5	Cluster of O-stars		11	large "proplyd-like" objects + dusty tails	
NGC 2244		4892	4	HD 46150	O5V	1	dusty tails	
Trifid Nebula		5479	8	HD 164492A	O7.5	1	gaseous	
Pismis 24		5544	1	Pis 24-1, Pis 24-2	O3I, O5.5 V(f)	5	gaseous	
Lagoon Nebula		5871	5	Herschel 36	O7V	1	gaseous	
Westerhout 5		7500	5	HD 17505, HD 18326	O6.5III((f))n+O8V, O7V	4	dusty tails	
Carina Nebula (disputed)		7501	3	Cluster of O-stars		"dozens"	large "proplyd-like" objects + dark disks	
Clusters Danks 1+2		12400		WR 48a	WC8d+Oe	6	dusty tails	
NGC 3603		19569	1	Cluster of O-stars		3	large "proplyd-like" objects	
Sgr A*		26673	unknown	Multiple O- and WR-stars		34	gaseous	

== Gallery ==
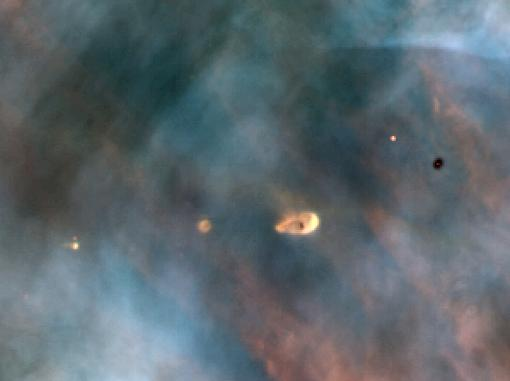
View of several proplyds within the Orion Nebula taken by the Hubble Space Telescope

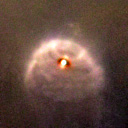
Very bright proplyd 181-825 in the Orion Nebula, from Hubble Space Telescope

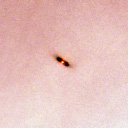
Dark proplyd 132-1832 in the Orion Nebula, from Hubble Space Telescope

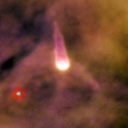
Bright proplyd 170-249 in the Orion Nebula, from Hubble Space Telescope. The upward tail is a jet of dust and gas blowing away from the excited proplyd

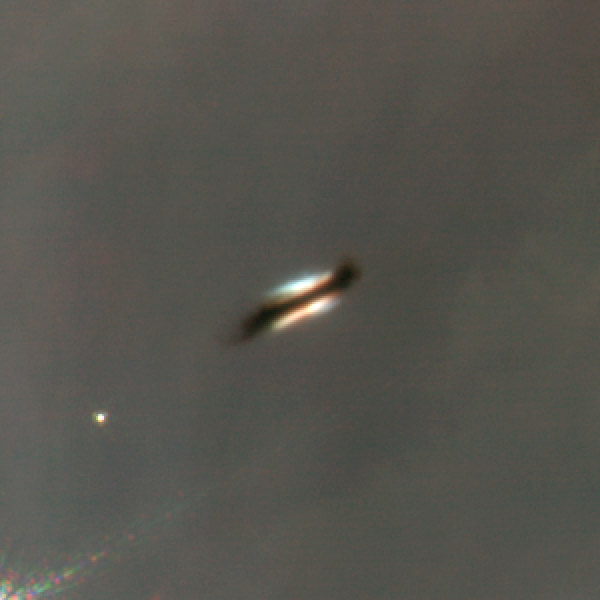
One of the largest dark proplyd in the Orion Nebula, Proplyd 114-426 imaged with JWST.

ESO VLT MUSE image of proplyd 244-440 in the Orion Nebula. The young object is ejecting a jet (red color) and is surrounded by a blue halo of unknown origin.

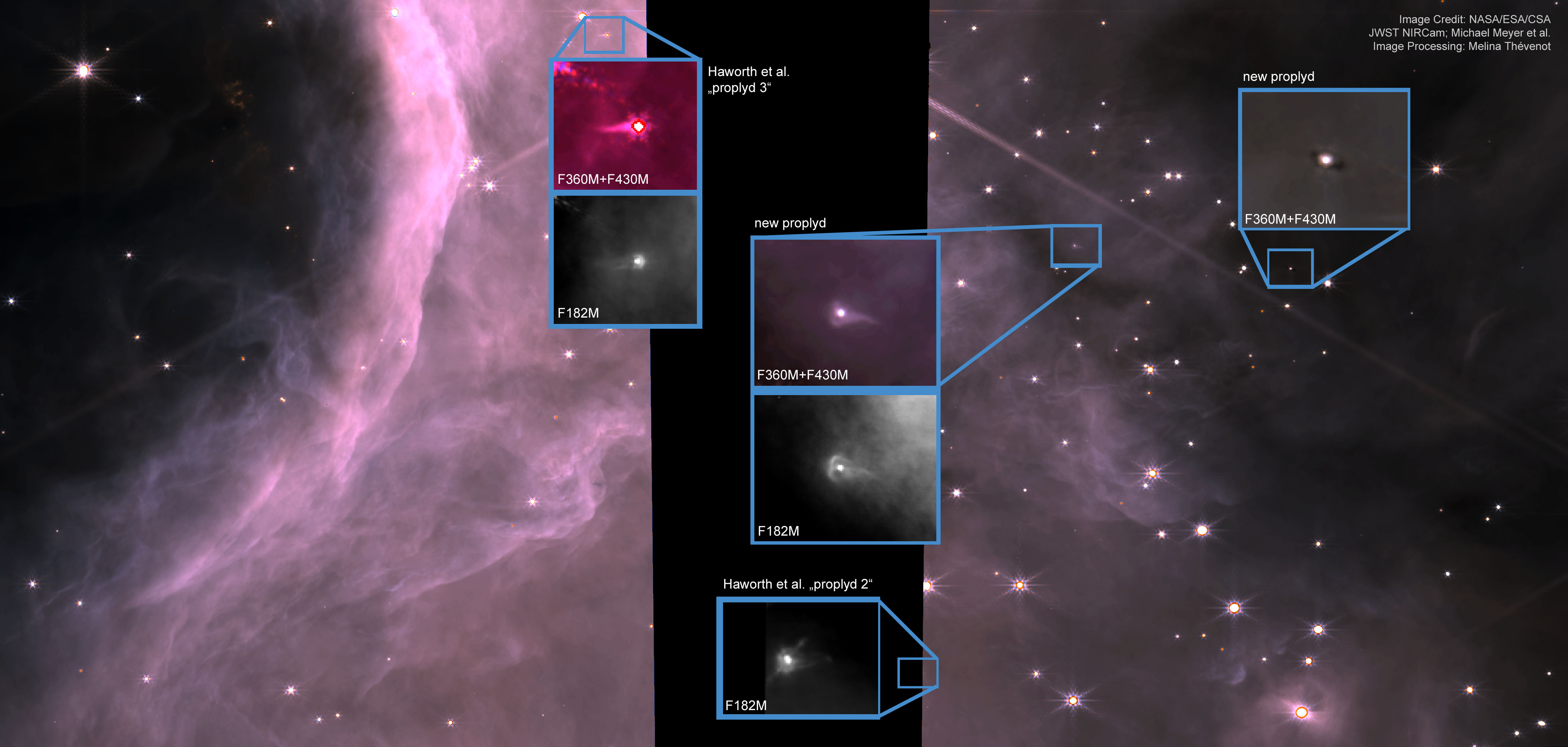
Proplyds in the Flame Nebula

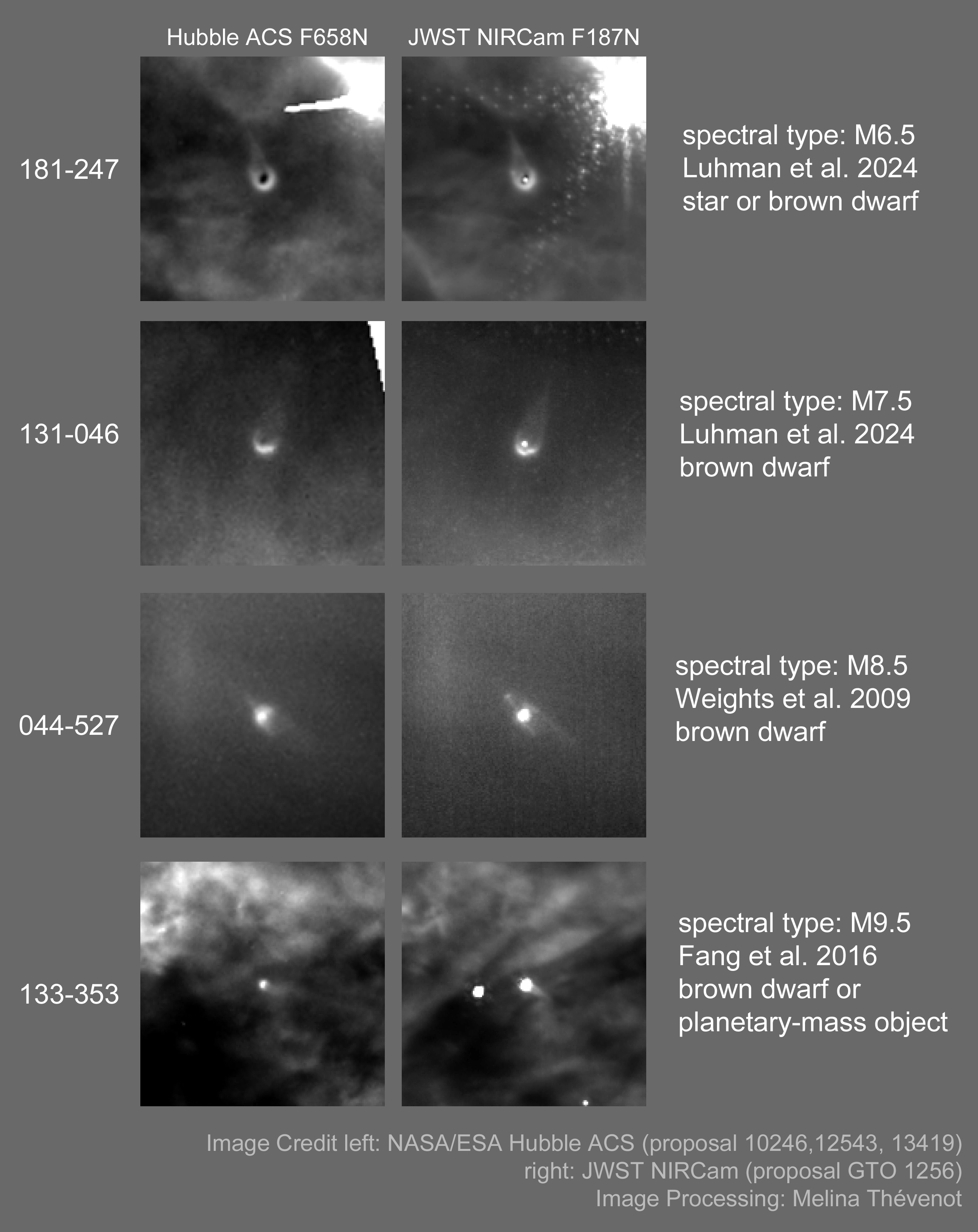
Proplyds in the Orion Nebula that are brown dwarfs according to Luhman et al. 2024

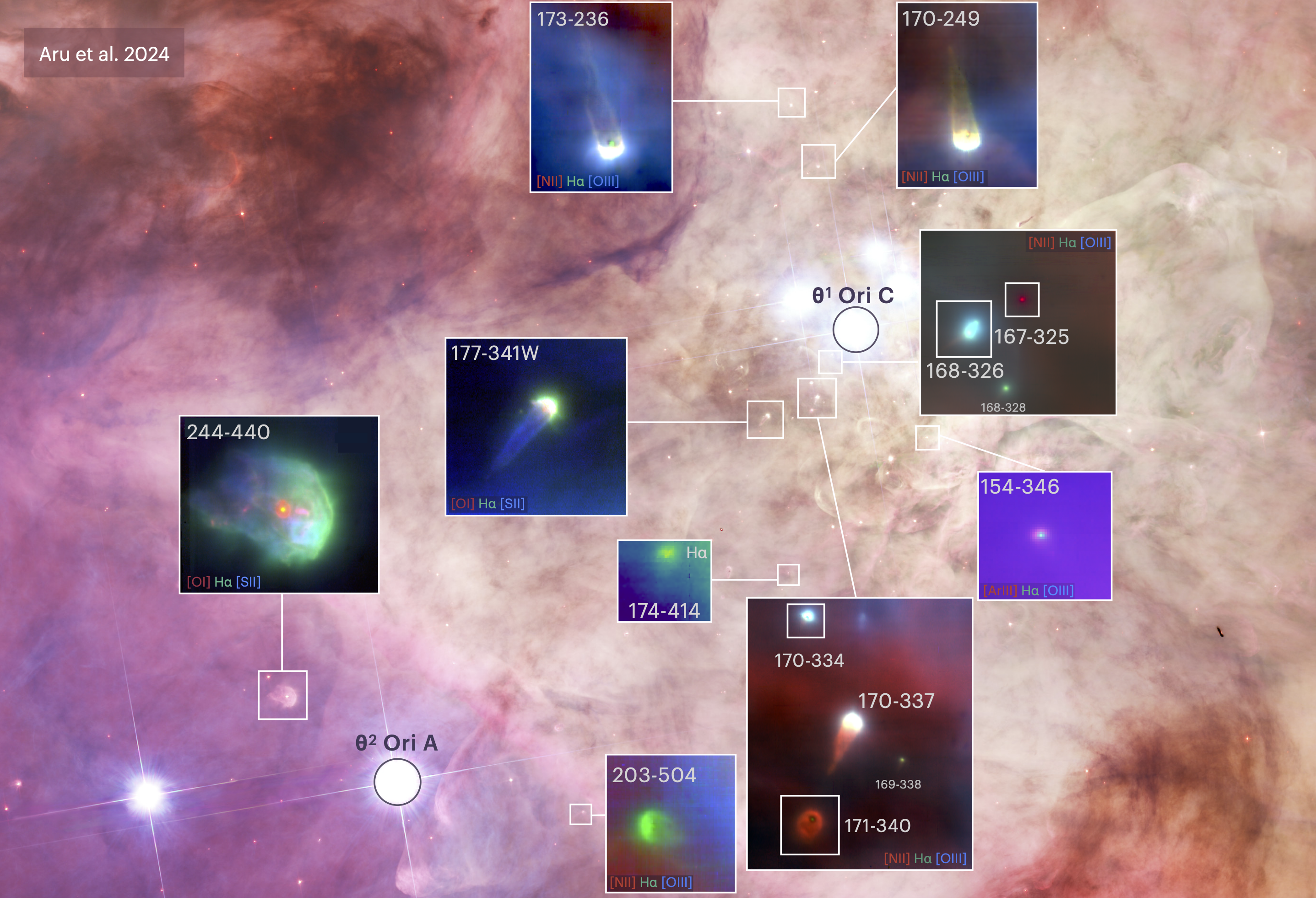
ESO VLT MUSE images (insets) of twelve proplyds in the Orion Nebula. In each inset, a variety of emission lines are combined to highlight the morphology of the proplyd.

== See also ==
- Formation and evolution of the Solar System
- Grand tack hypothesis
- Late Heavy Bombardment
- Nice model
- Photoevaporation
- Planetary migration
- Wiki commons photos: Bright and dark proplyds in the Orion Nebula
