= 42 Orionis =

Star in the constellation of Orion

- Location of 42 Orionis (marked red)

Observation data Epoch J2000 Equinox ICRS
- Constellation: Orion
- Right ascension: 05^{h} 35^{m} 23.16427^{s}
- Declination: −04° 50′ 18.0881″
- Apparent magnitude (V): 4.59

Characteristics
- Spectral type: B1V
- U−B color index: −0.94
- B−V color index: −0.19

Astrometry
Radial velocity (R_{v})	+28.40 km/s
Proper motion (μ)	RA: +4.52 mas/yr Dec.: −7.11 mas/yr
Parallax (π)	3.69±1.20 mas
Distance	approx. 900 ly (approx. 270 pc)

Orbit
Period (P)	69.2 yr
Semi-major axis (a)	0.146″
Eccentricity (e)	0.23
Inclination (i)	28.1°
Longitude of the node (Ω)	125.4°
Periastron epoch (T)	1986.4
Argument of periastron (ω) (secondary)	84.7°

Details
Mass	12.0 M_{☉}
Radius	7.0 R_{☉}
Luminosity	10,737 L_{☉}
Surface gravity (log g)	3.82 cgs
Temperature	25,400 K
Rotational velocity (v sin i)	20 km/s
Age	2.6 Myr

Other designations
- c Orionis, BD−04°1185, CCDM J05354-0450AB, GC 6934, HIP 26237, HR 1892, HD 37018, NSV 2318, SAO 132320, WDS J05354-0450AB

Database references
SIMBAD	data

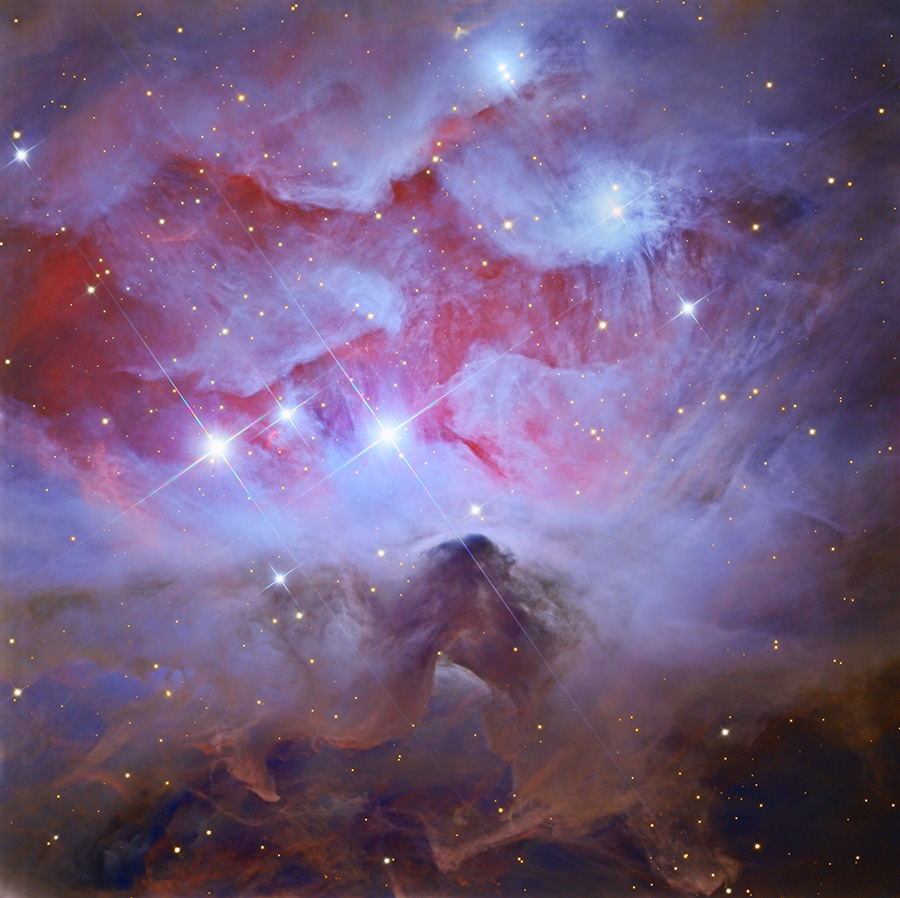
42 Ori is the bright star at the centre of NGC 1977.

42 Orionis, also known as c Orionis or c Ori, is a triple star system in the constellation Orion. Its apparent magnitude is 4.59 and it is approximately 900 light years away based on parallax.

The primary star, Aa, has one spectroscopic companion Ab of magnitude 6.3 and separation 0.16", and a more distant companion B of 7.5 magnitude at 1.6" separation. Preliminary results published in 2026 give an orbtal period of 69.2 years, an eccentricity of 0.23 and an inclination of 28.1° for the inner companion.

42 Orionis is surrounded by NGC 1977 one of a smaller fainter group of named nebulae just north of the Orion Nebula. 42 Ori is the star which excites and illuminates NGC 1977.
