= Flame Nebula =

Emission nebula in the constellation Orion

NGC 2024
Emission nebula
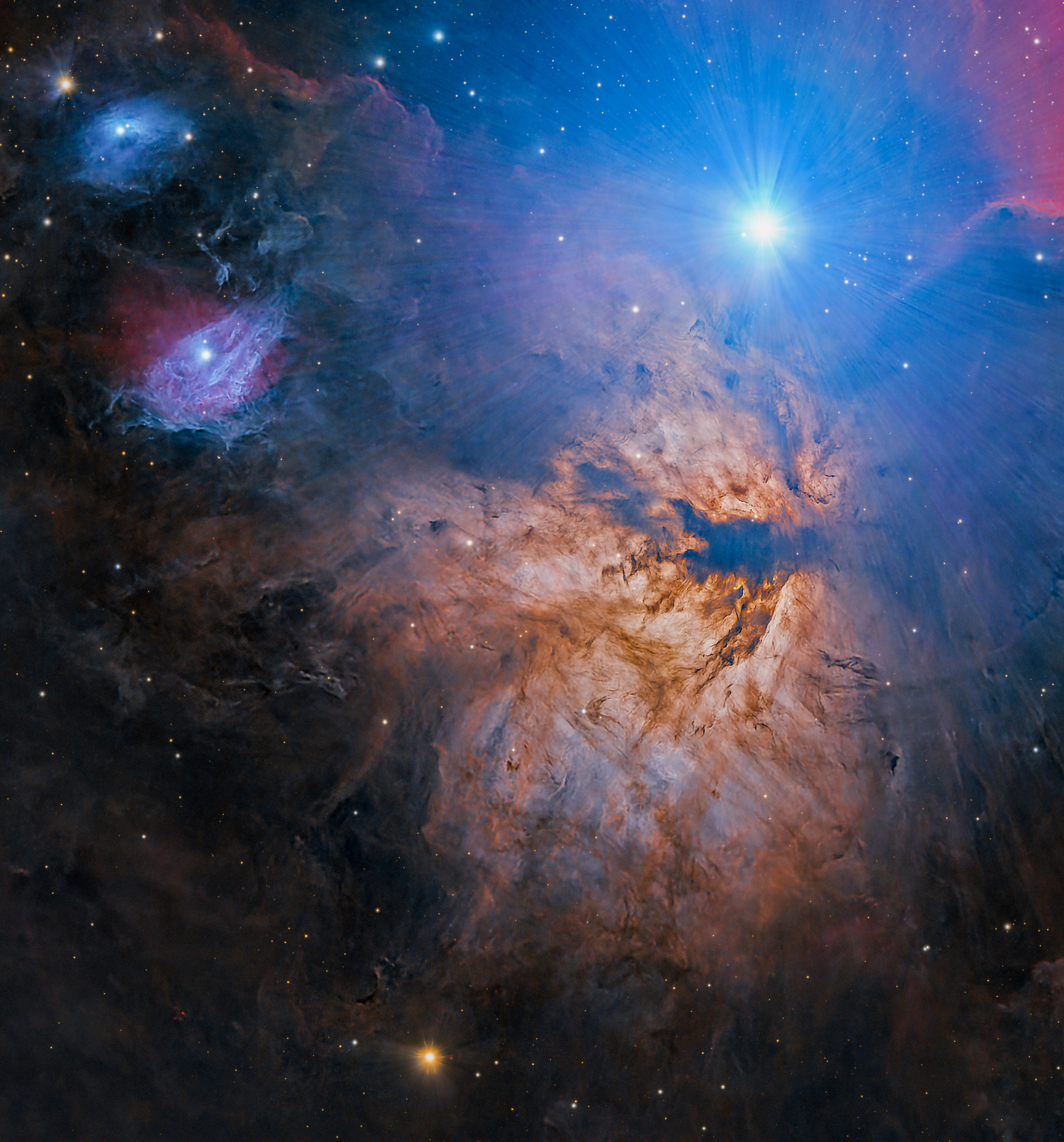
- The Flame Nebula in visible light (broadband). The star above it is Alnitak. The nebulae to the upper left are IC 431 and IC 432.

Observation data: J2000.0 epoch
- Right ascension: 05^{h} 41^{m} 54^{s}
- Declination: −01° 51′ 0.0″
- Distance: 1,350 ly (410 pc) ly (415 pc)
- Apparent magnitude (V): 10
- Apparent dimensions (V): 30′
- Constellation: Orion

Physical characteristics
- Radius: 6 ly
- Designations: NGC 2024 and Sharpless 277

The Flame Nebula is an emission nebula in the constellation Orion. Alternatively, it is designated as NGC 2024 and Sh2-277, and is also commonly known as the Lips Nebula, Burning Bush Nebula, Tank Tracks Nebula, Ghost of Alnitak, or One Piece Nebula. It is about 1350 light-years away. At that distance, the Flame Nebula lies within the Orion B cloud of the larger Orion Molecular Cloud Complex.

The bright star Alnitak (ζ Ori), the easternmost star in the Belt of Orion, appears very close to the Flame Nebula in the sky. But the star and nebula are not physically associated with one another. The Flame Nebula contains a young cluster of stars which includes at least one hot, luminous O-type star labeled IRS 2b. The dense gas and dust in the foreground of the nebula heavily obscures the star cluster inside the nebula, making studies at infrared wavelengths most useful.

The energetic ultraviolet light emitted by the central O-type star IRS 2b into the Flame Nebula causes the gas to be excited and heated. The glow of the nebula results from the energy input from this central star. Within the nebula and surrounding the central hot star is a cluster of young, lower-mass stars, 86% of which have circumstellar disks. X-ray observations by the Chandra X-ray Observatory show several hundred young stars, out of an estimated population of 800 stars. X-ray and infrared images indicate that the young stars are concentrated near the center of the cluster.

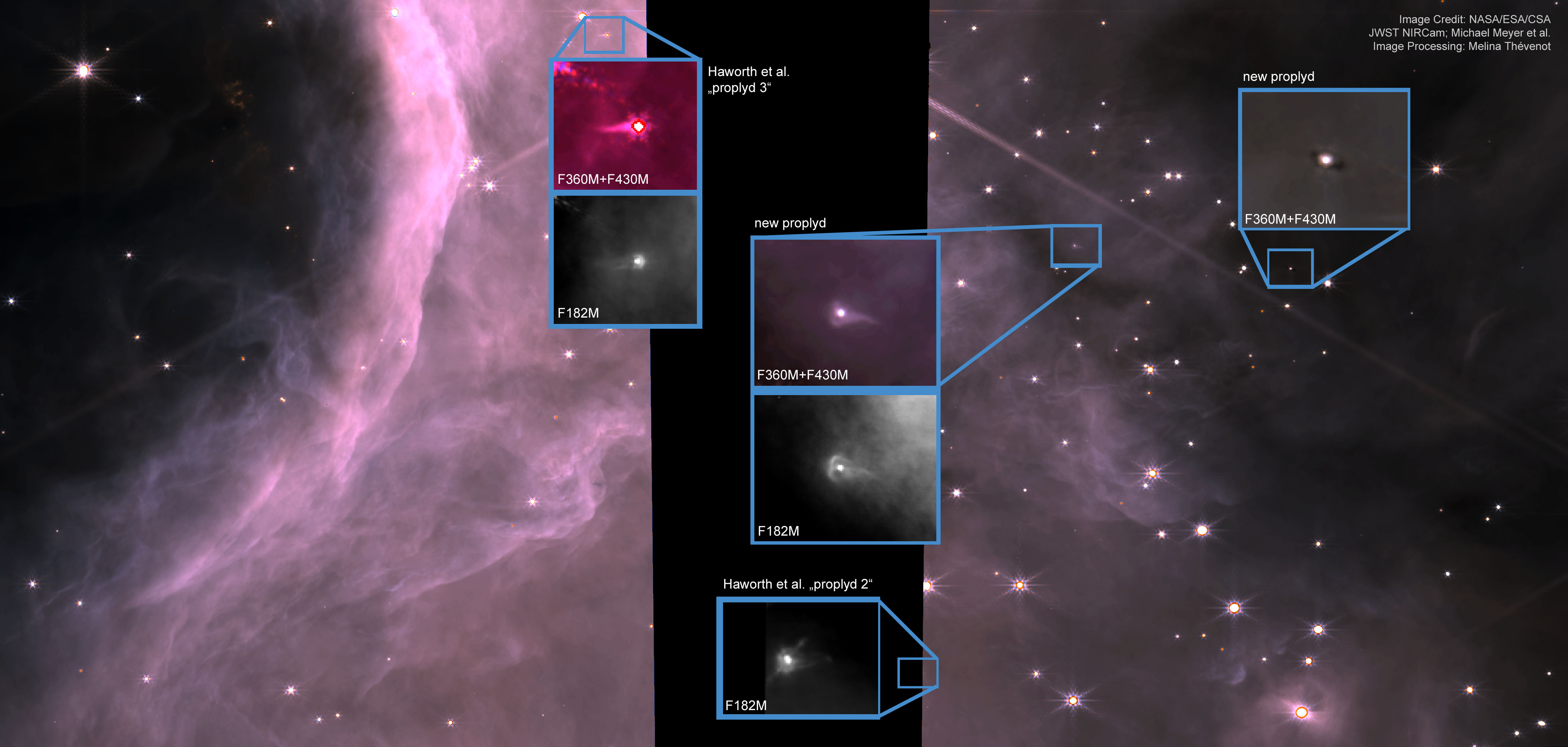
The center of the Flame Nebula seen by JWST NIRCam, revealing proplyds in new detail and revealing two new candidates.

The Flame Nebula was observed with ALMA and this study found two populations, which are separated by a molecular cloud. The eastern population is 0.2-0.5 Myr old and has a disk fraction of 45±7%. The western population is slightly older at 1 Myr and has a lower disk fraction of 15±4%. This disk fraction is lower than the one observed in the mid-infrared, but the ALMA survey also observed a smaller region. The eastern part contains the O8 star IRS 2b and the western part contains the B0.5V star IRS 1. Hubble observations have shown that the Flame Nebula contains 4 clear proplyds and 4 candidate proplyds. Three of these are in the older western region and are pointing towards IRS 1. The other 5 are in the younger eastern region and are pointing towards IRS 2b.

== Gallery ==
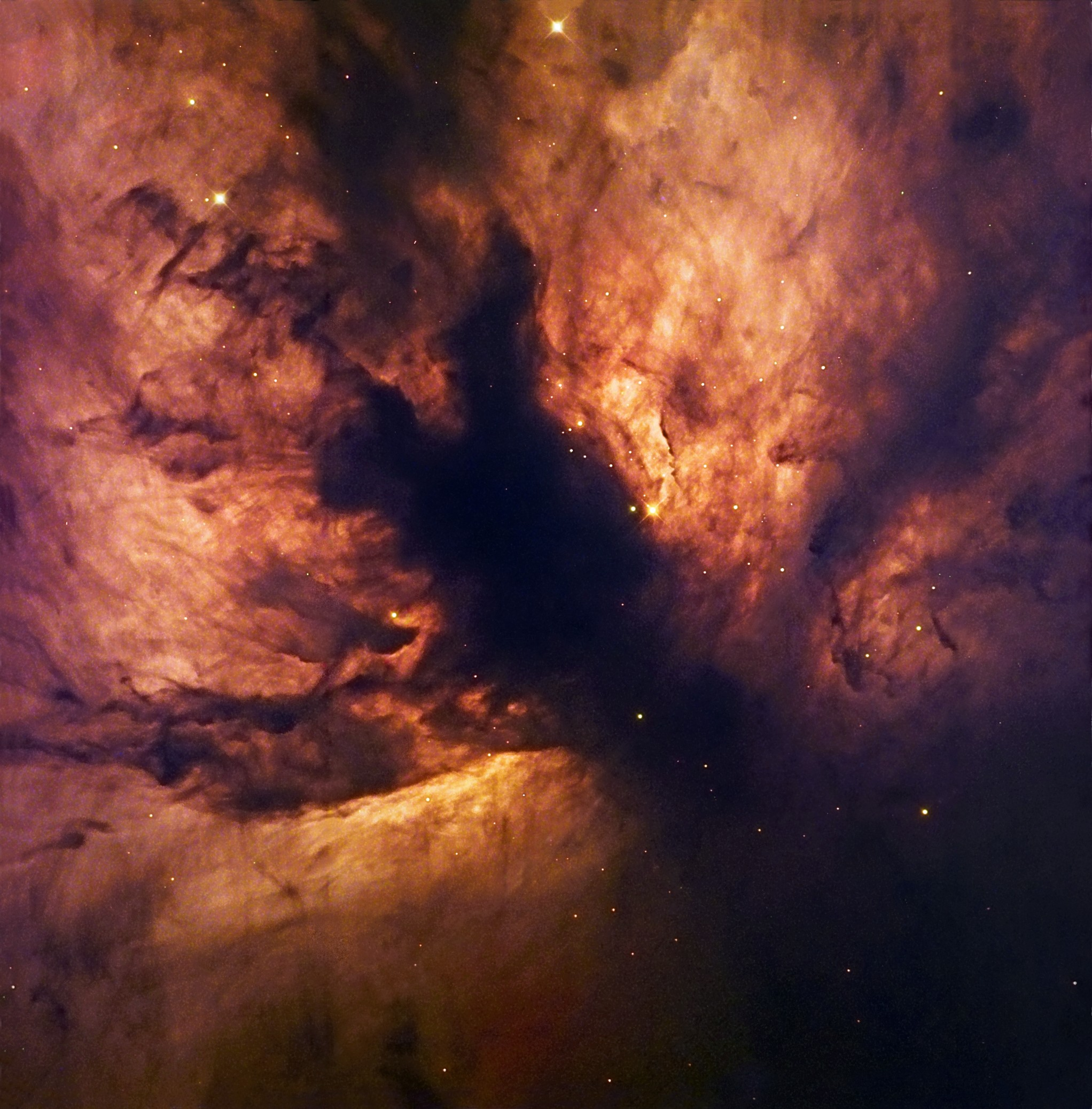
Optical image in B, V and R filters, from La Silla Observatory

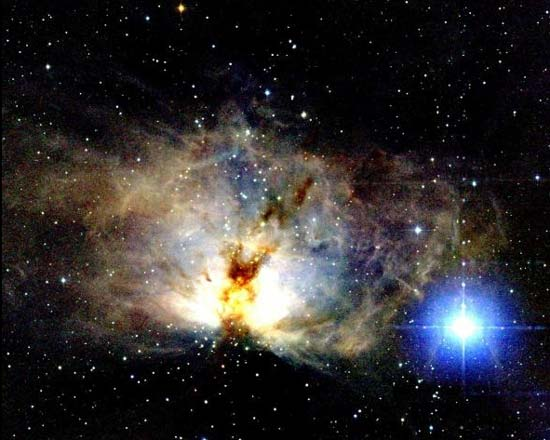
Infrared image, from 2MASS

Near-infrared image, from VISTA

Visible light wide-field view of region of Orion's Belt and the Flame Nebula

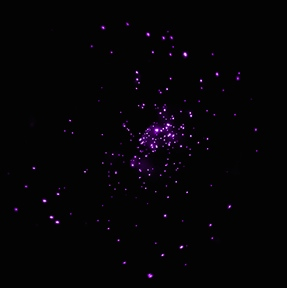
NGC 2024 seen by the Chandra X-ray Observatory

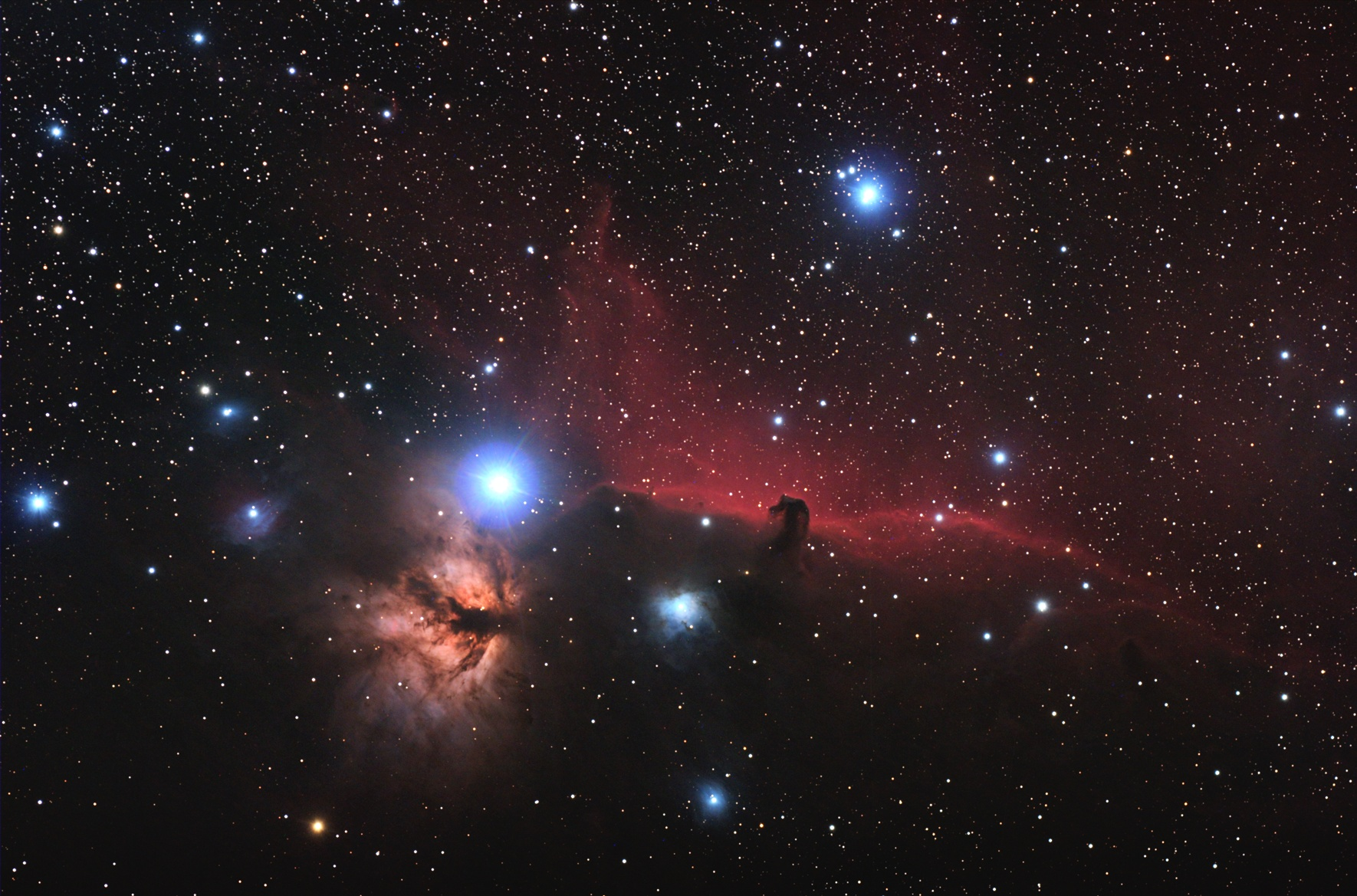
Flame Nebula and Horsehead Nebula

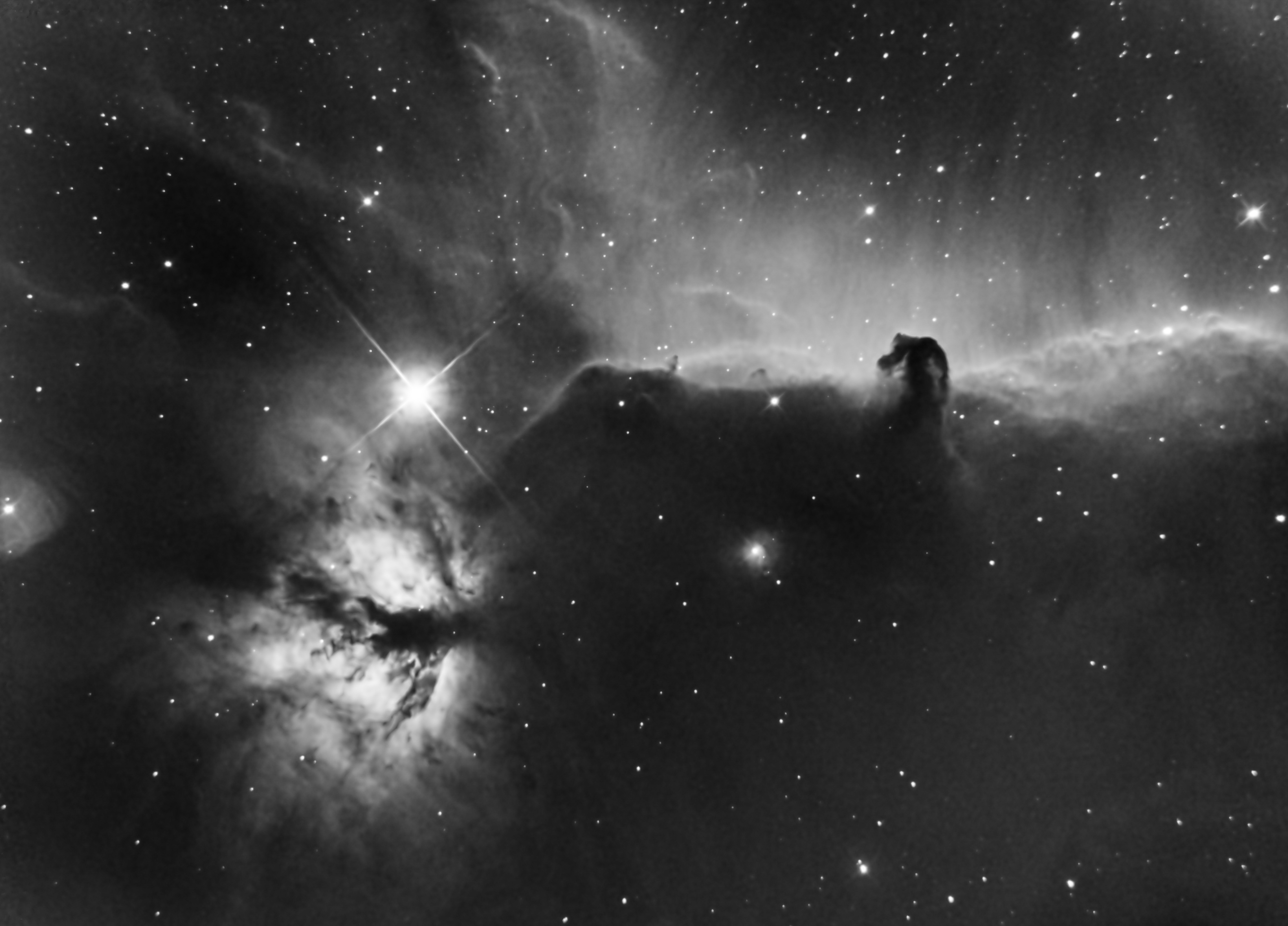
Horsehead and Flame Nebulae in H-alpha

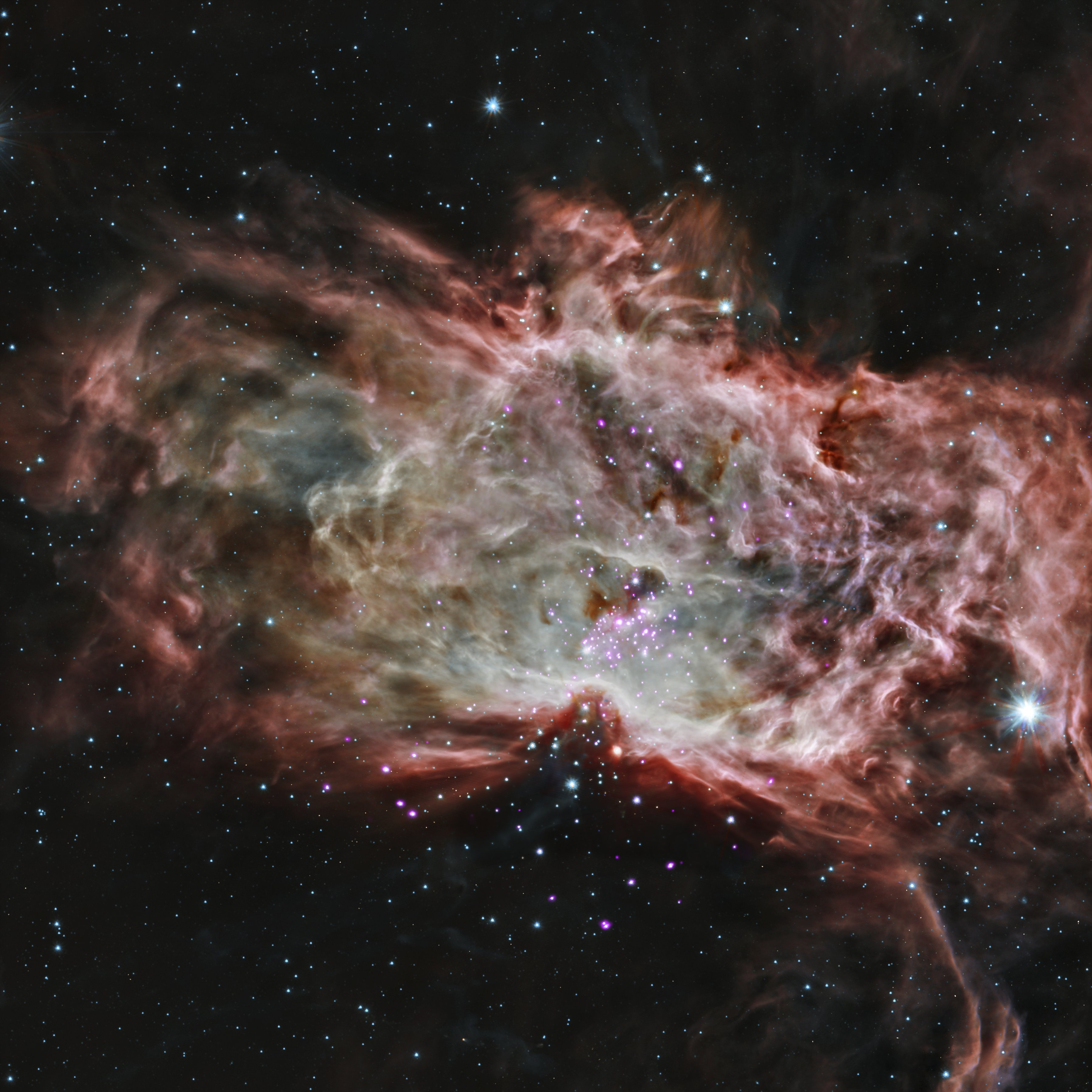
The Flame Nebula (NGC 2024) - based on Chandra X-Ray and Spitzer Infrared images
