= Orion Nebula =

Diffuse nebula in the constellation Orion

Diffuse nebula
- The entire Orion Nebula in a composite image of visible light and infrared; taken by the Hubble Space Telescope in 2006

Observation data: J2000 epoch
- Subtype: Reflection/Emission
- Right ascension: 05^{h} 35^{m} 16.8^{s}
- Declination: −05° 23′ 15″
- Distance: 1,267.0±5.4 ly (389±1.7‍ pc)
- Apparent magnitude (V): 4.0
- Apparent dimensions (V): 65×60 arcmins
- Constellation: Orion

Physical characteristics
- Radius: 13 (Note: 1,344 × tan( 65 arcmins / 2 ) = 12.7 lightyears radius) ly
- Absolute magnitude (V): -4.1
- Notable features: Trapezium cluster
- Designations: NGC 1976, M42, LBN 974, Sharpless 281

The Orion Nebula (also known as Messier 42, M42, or NGC 1976) is a diffuse nebula in the Milky Way situated south of Orion's Belt in the constellation of Orion, (Note: From temperate zones in the Northern Hemisphere, the nebula appears below the Belt of Orion; from temperate zones in the Southern Hemisphere the nebula appears above the Belt.) and is known as the middle "star" in the "sword" of Orion. It is one of the brightest nebulae and is visible to the naked eye in the night sky with an apparent magnitude of 4.0. It is 1,267.0 ± 5.4 light-years (388.5 ± 1.7 pc) away and is the closest region of massive star formation to Earth. M42 is estimated to be 25 light-years across (so its apparent size from Earth is approximately 1 degree). It has a mass of about 2,000 times that of the Sun. Older texts frequently refer to the Orion Nebula as the Great Nebula in Orion or the Great Orion Nebula.

The Orion Nebula is one of the most scrutinized and photographed objects in the night sky. The nebula has revealed much about the process of how stars and planetary systems are formed from collapsing clouds of gas and dust. Astronomers have directly observed protoplanetary disks and brown dwarfs within the nebula, intense and turbulent motions of the gas, and the photo-ionizing effects of massive nearby stars in the nebula.

== Physical characteristics ==
Discussing the location of the Orion Nebula, what is seen within the star-formation region, and the effects of interstellar winds in shaping the nebula

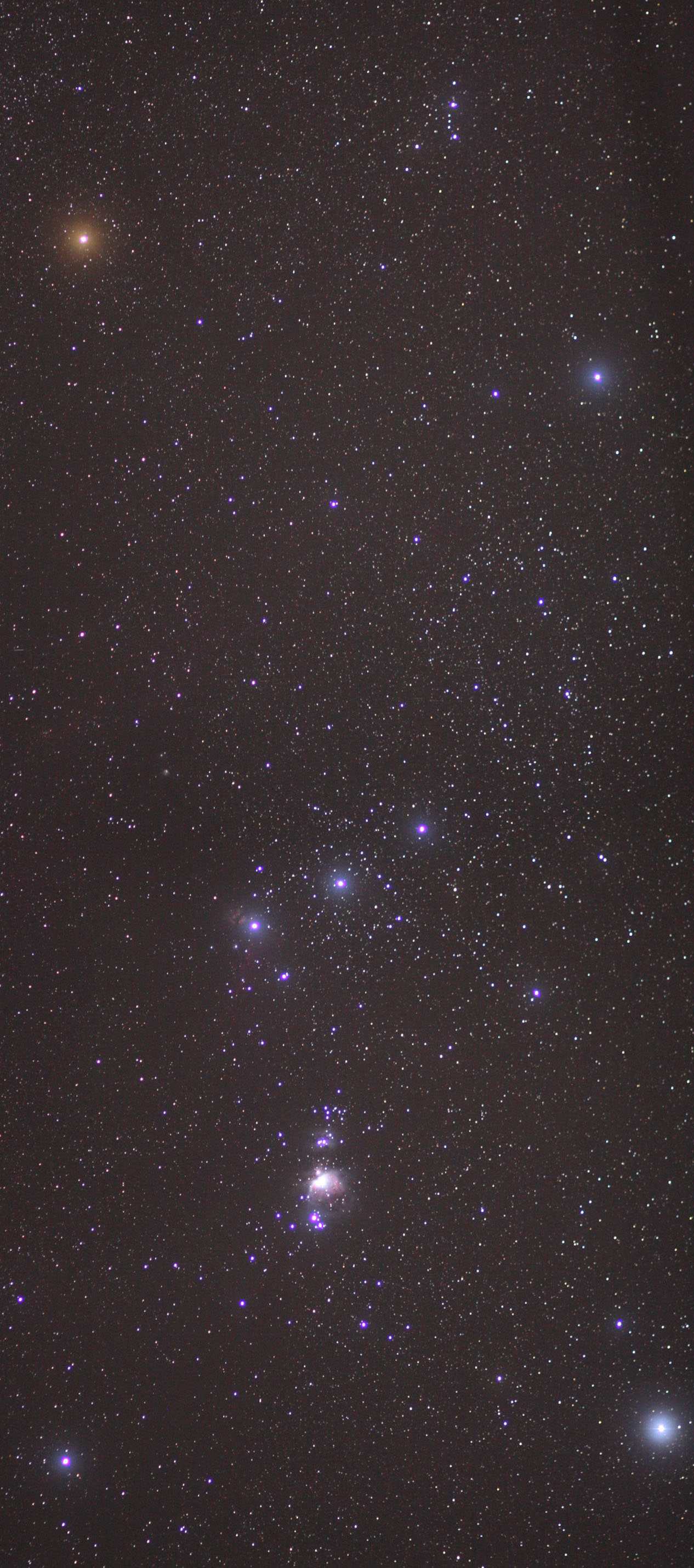
The constellation of Orion with the Orion Nebula (lower middle)

The Orion Nebula is visible with the naked eye even from areas affected by light pollution. It is seen as the middle "star" in the "sword" of Orion, which are the three stars located south of Orion's Belt. The "star" appears fuzzy to sharp-eyed observers, and the nebulosity is obvious through binoculars or a small telescope. The peak surface brightness of the central region of M42 is about 17 Mag/arcsec^{2} and the outer bluish glow has a peak surface brightness of 21.3 Mag/arcsec^{2}.

The Orion Nebula contains a very young open cluster, known as the Trapezium Cluster due to the asterism of its primary four stars within a diameter of 1.5 light years. Two of these can be resolved into their component binary systems on nights with good seeing, giving a total of six stars. The stars of the Trapezium Cluster, along with many other stars, are still in their early years. The Trapezium Cluster is a component of the much larger Orion Nebula cluster, an association of about 2,800 stars within a diameter of 20 light years. The Orion Nebula is in turn surrounded by the much larger Orion molecular cloud complex, which is hundreds of light years across, spanning the whole Orion Constellation. Two million years ago the Orion Nebula cluster may have been the home of the runaway stars AE Aurigae, 53 Arietis, and Mu Columbae, which are currently moving away from the nebula at speeds greater than 100 km/s (62 mi/s).

It has been speculated that the nebula may contain an intermediate-mass black hole with 200 solar masses.

=== Coloration ===
Observers have long noted a distinctive greenish tint to the nebula, in addition to regions of red and of blue-violet. The red hue is a result of the Hα recombination line radiation at a wavelength of 656.3 nm. The blue-violet coloration is the reflected radiation from the massive O-class stars at the core of the nebula.

The green hue was a puzzle for astronomers in the early part of the 20th century because none of the known spectral lines at that time could explain it. There was some speculation that the lines were caused by a new element, and the name nebulium was coined for this mysterious material. With better understanding of atomic physics, however, it was later determined that the green spectrum was caused by a low-probability electron transition in doubly ionized oxygen, a so-called "forbidden transition". This radiation was impossible to reproduce in the laboratory at the time, because it depended on the quiescent and nearly collision-free environment found in the high vacuum of deep space.

== History ==
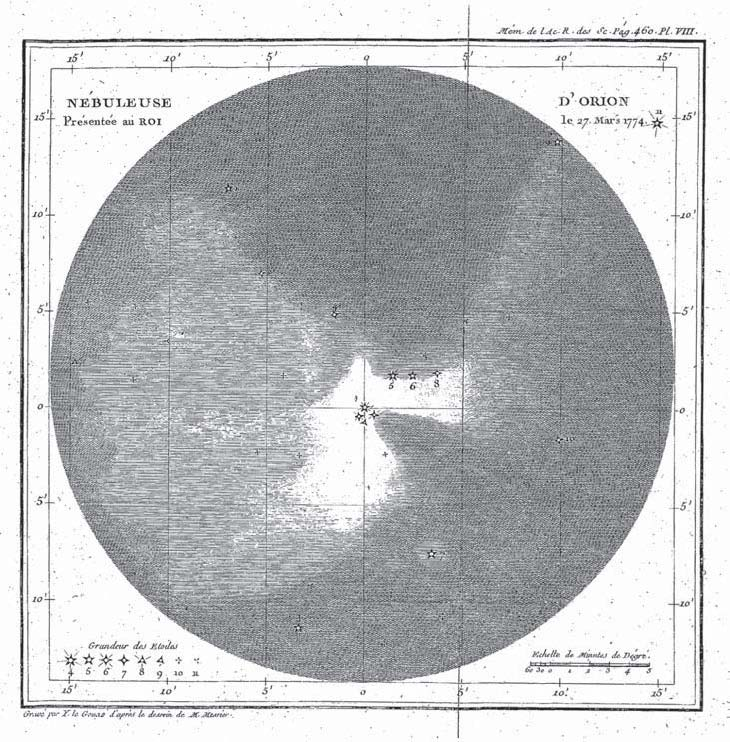
Messier's drawing of the Orion Nebula in his 1771 memoir, Mémoires de l'Académie Royale

There has been speculation that the Mayans of Central America may have described the nebula within their "Three Hearthstones" creation myth; if so, the three would correspond to two stars at the base of Orion, Rigel and Saiph, and another, Alnitak at the southern (left) tip of the "hunter's belt", which together form the vertices of a nearly perfect equilateral triangle, the same shape as traditional Mayan hearths. Near the center of the triangle is Orion's Sword (including the Orion Nebula), which ancient Mayan mythology regarded as the literal or figurative embers of a fiery creation smoldering at the center of the hearth. Similarly, modern Lacandon Maya regard it as smoke from copal incense.

Neither Ptolemy's Almagest nor al Sufi's Book of Fixed Stars noted this nebula, even though they both listed patches of nebulosity elsewhere in the night sky; nor did Galileo mention it, even though he also made telescopic observations surrounding it in 1610 and 1617. This has led to some speculation that a flare-up of the illuminating stars may have increased the brightness of the nebula.

The first discovery of the diffuse nebulous nature of the Orion Nebula is generally credited to French astronomer Nicolas-Claude Fabri de Peiresc, on November 26, 1610, when he recorded observing it with a refracting telescope purchased by his patron Guillaume du Vair.

The first published observation of the nebula was by the Jesuit mathematician and astronomer Johann Baptist Cysat of Lucerne in his 1619 monograph on the comets (describing observations of the nebula that may date back to 1611). He made comparisons between it and a bright comet seen in 1618, describing how the nebula appeared through his telescope:

One sees how in like manner some stars are compressed into a very narrow space and how round about and between the stars a white light like that of a white cloud is poured out.

His description of the center stars as different from a comet's head in that they were a "rectangle" may have been an early description of the Trapezium Cluster. (The first detection of three of the four stars of this cluster is credited to Galileo Galilei on February 4, 1617.)

The nebula was independently "discovered" (though visible to the naked eye) by several other prominent astronomers in the following years, including by Giovanni Battista Hodierna (whose sketch was the first published in De systemate orbis cometici, deque admirandis coeli characteribus). In 1659, Dutch scientist Christiaan Huygens published the first detailed drawing of the central region of the nebula in Systema Saturnium.

Charles Messier observed the nebula on March 4, 1769, and he also noted three of the stars in Trapezium. Messier published the first edition of his catalog of deep sky objects in 1774 (completed in 1771). As the Orion Nebula was the 42nd object in his list, it became identified as M42.

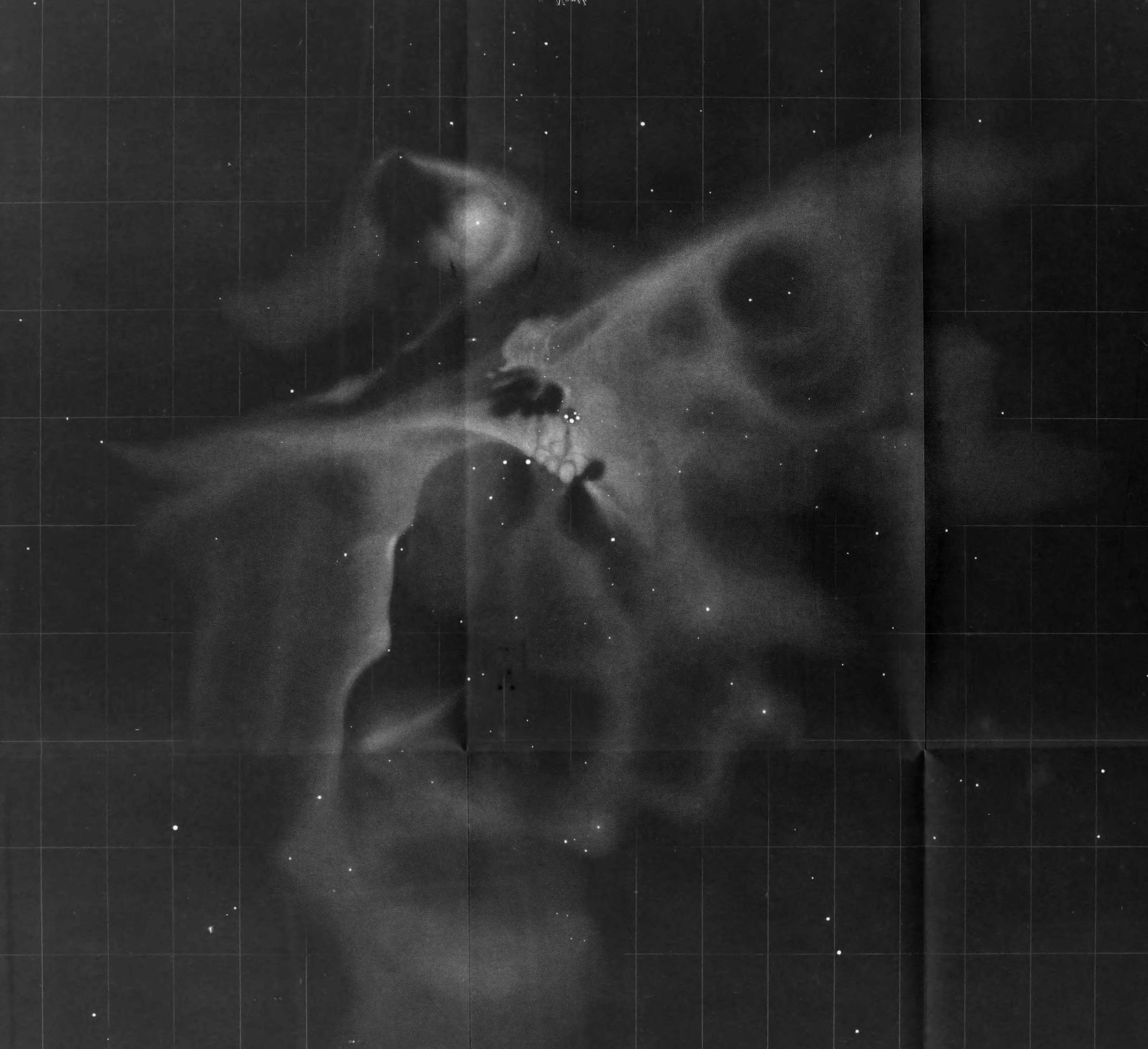
Herschel's drawing of the nebula as seen from the southern hemisphere as part of his survey of the visible heavens, 1835.

John Herschel conducted the first survey of the nebula as seen from the southern hemisphere in the period between 1834 to 1838. The Orion Nebula was observed and charted as part of Herschel's survey of the whole surface of the visible heavens starting in 1825, the southern hemisphere observations conducted from a private 21 ft (6.4 m) telescope in what is today Cape Town, South Africa.

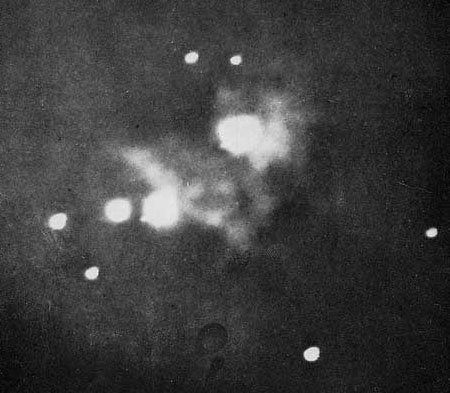
Henry Draper's 1880 photograph of the Orion Nebula, the first ever taken.

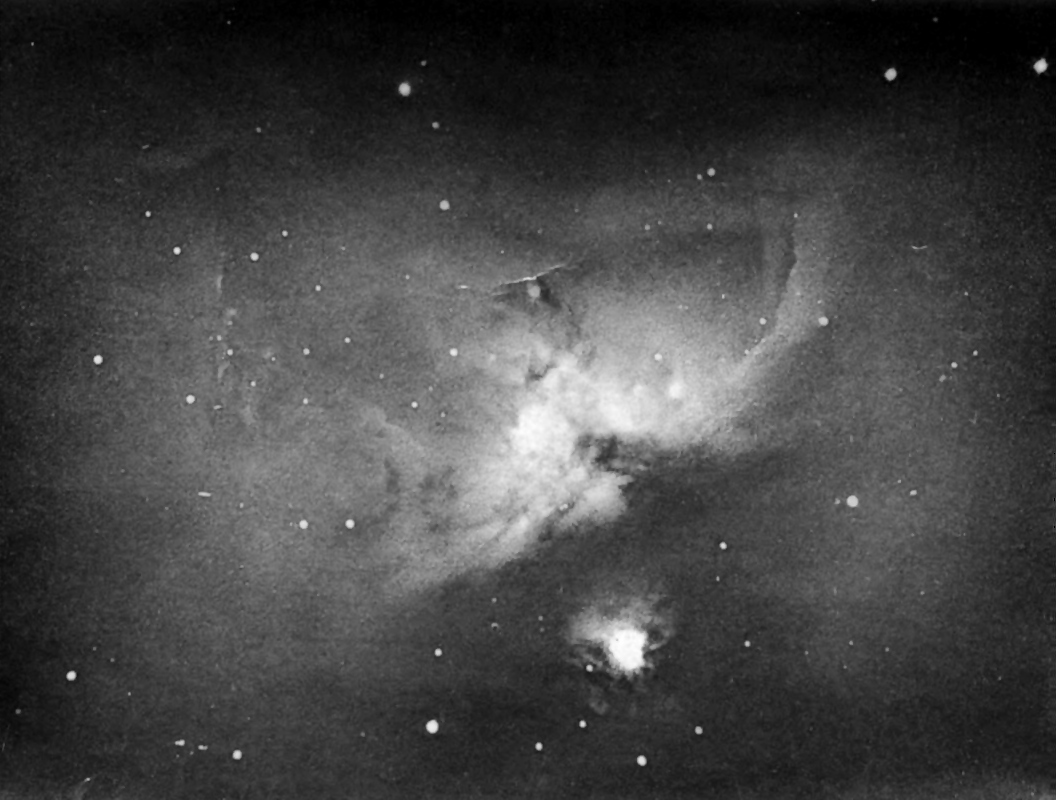
One of Andrew Ainslie Common's 1883 photographs of the Orion Nebula, the first to show that a long exposure could record new stars and nebulae invisible to the human eye.

In 1865, English amateur astronomer William Huggins used his visual spectroscopy method to examine the nebula, showing that it, like other nebulae he had examined, was made up of "luminous gas". On September 30, 1880, Henry Draper used the new dry plate photographic process with an 11-inch (28 cm) refracting telescope to make a 51-minute exposure of the Orion Nebula, the first instance of astrophotography of a nebula in history. Another breakthrough in astronomical photography occurred in 1883, when amateur astronomer Andrew Ainslie Common used the dry plate process to record several images in exposures up to 60 minutes with a 36-inch (91 cm) reflecting telescope that he constructed in the backyard of his home in Ealing, west London. These images, for the first time, showed stars and nebula detail too faint to be seen by the human eye.

In 1902, Vogel and Eberhard discovered differing velocities within the nebula, and by 1914 astronomers at Marseille had used the interferometer to detect rotation and irregular motions. Campbell and Moore confirmed these results using the spectrograph, demonstrating turbulence within the nebula.

In 1931, Robert J. Trumpler noted that the fainter stars near the Trapezium formed a cluster, and he was the first to name them the "Trapezium Cluster". Based on their magnitudes and spectral types, he derived a distance estimate of 1,800 light years. This was three times farther than the commonly accepted distance estimate of the period but was much closer to the modern value.

In 1993, the Hubble Space Telescope (HST) first observed the Orion Nebula. Since then, the nebula has been a frequent target for HST studies. The images have been used to build a detailed model of the nebula in three dimensions. Protoplanetary disks have been observed around most of the newly formed stars in the nebula, and the destructive effects of high levels of ultraviolet energy from the most massive stars have been studied.

In 2005, the Advanced Camera for Surveys instrument of the Hubble Space Telescope finished capturing the most detailed image of the nebula yet taken. The image was taken through 104 orbits of the telescope, capturing over 3,000 stars down to the 23rd magnitude, including infant brown dwarfs and possible brown dwarf binary stars. A year later, scientists working with the HST announced the first ever masses of a pair of eclipsing binary brown dwarfs, 2MASS J05352184–0546085. The pair are located in the Orion Nebula and have approximate masses of 0.054 M_{☉} and 0.034 M_{☉} respectively, with an orbital period of 9.8 days. Surprisingly, the more massive of the two also turned out to be the less luminous.

In October 2023, astronomers, based on observations of the Orion Nebula with the James Webb Space Telescope, reported the discovery of pairs of rogue planets, similar in mass to the planet Jupiter, and called JuMBOs (Jupiter Mass Binary Objects).

In July 2025, observations of the Orion Nebula using the JWST and ALMA yielded direct imagery of an exoplanet forming from the protoplanetary disk of HOPS-315, a protostar within the nebula which is itself in the active phase of its formation. Ordinarily, clouds of dust and gas surrounding protostars prevent direct observation of the earliest phases of the planetary formation process; however, a gap in the clouds surrounding HOPS-315 allowed scientists to directly observe the moment when the formation of a planet is initiated.

== Structure ==
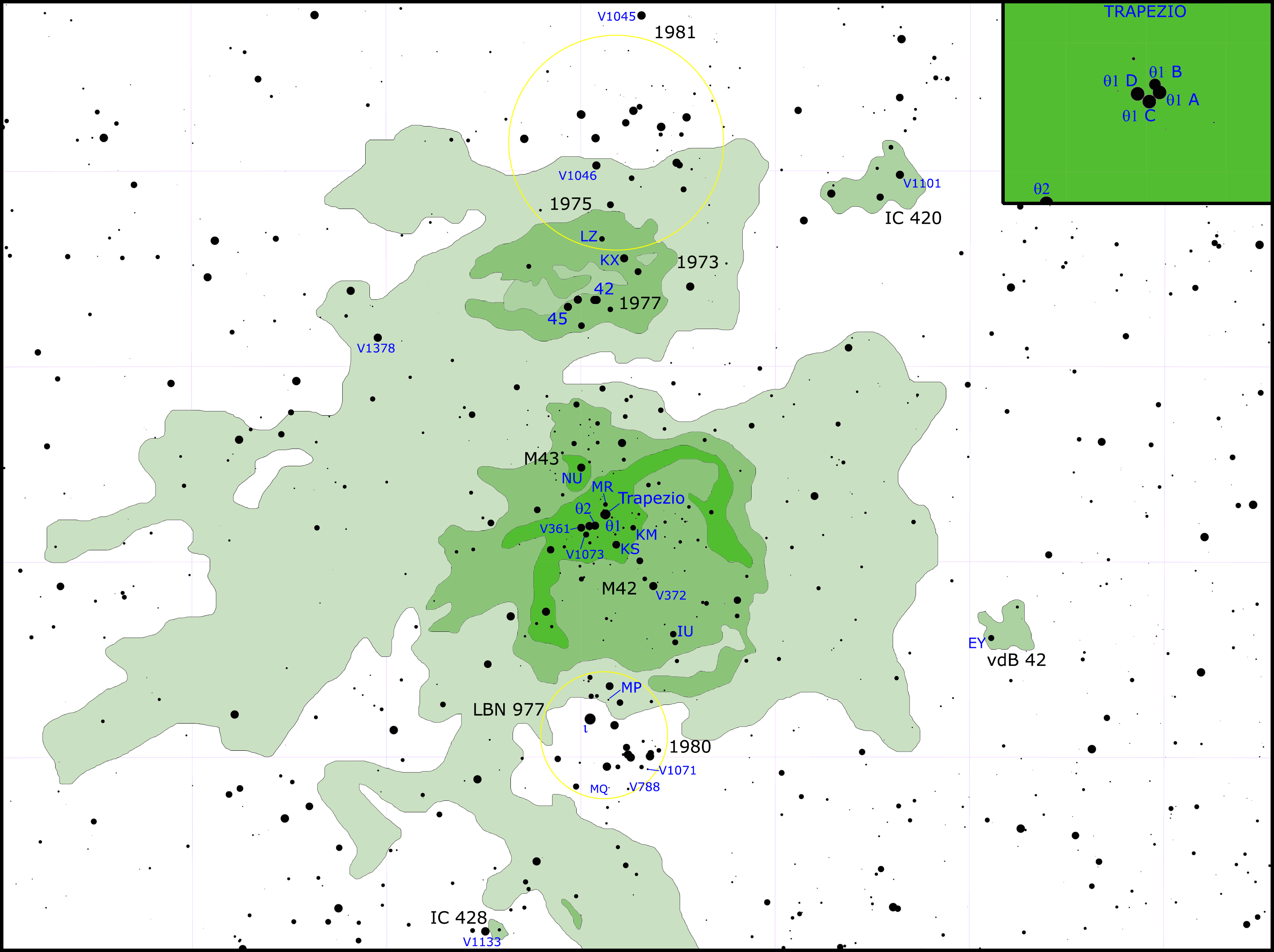
A starchart of the Orion Nebula

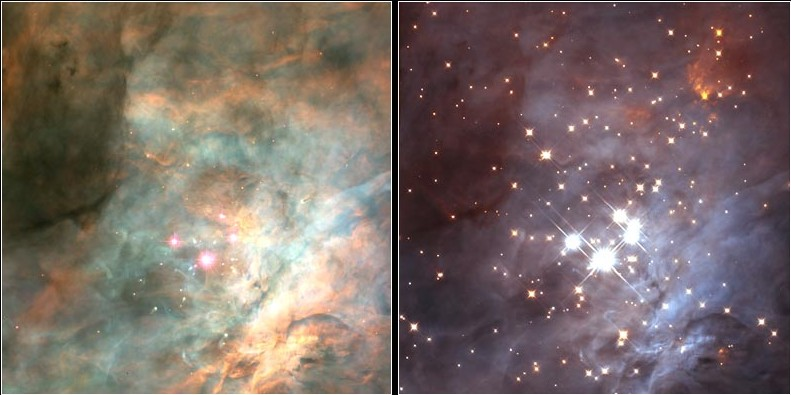
Optical images reveal clouds of gas and dust in the Orion Nebula; an infrared image (right) reveals the new stars shining within.

The entirety of the Orion Nebula extends across a 1° region of the sky, and includes neutral clouds of gas and dust, associations of stars, ionized volumes of gas, and reflection nebulae.

The Orion Nebula is part of a much larger nebula known as the Orion molecular cloud complex, which extends throughout the constellation of Orion and includes Barnard's Loop, the Horsehead Nebula, M43, M78, and the Flame Nebula. Stars are forming throughout the entire Cloud Complex, but most of the young stars are concentrated in dense clusters like the one illuminating the Orion Nebula.

Orion A molecular cloud from VISTA reveals many young stars and other objects.

The current astronomical model for the nebula consists of an ionized (H II) region, roughly centered on Theta^{1} Orionis C, which lies on the side of an elongated molecular cloud in a cavity formed by the massive young stars. (Theta^{1} Orionis C emits 3-4 times as much photoionizing light as the next brightest star, Theta^{2} Orionis A.) The H II region has a temperature ranging up to 10,000 K, but this temperature falls dramatically near the edge of the nebula. The nebulous emission comes primarily from photoionized gas on the back surface of the cavity. The H II region is surrounded by an irregular, concave bay of more neutral, high-density cloud, with clumps of neutral gas lying outside the bay area. This in turn lies on the perimeter of the Orion molecular cloud. The gas in the molecular cloud displays a range of velocities and turbulence, particularly around the core region. Relative movements are up to 10 km/s (22,000 mph), with local variations of up to 50 km/s and possibly more.

Observers have given names to various features in the Orion Nebula. The dark bay that extends from the north into the bright region is known as "Sinus Magnus", also called the "Fish's Mouth". The illuminated regions to both sides are called the "Wings". Other features include "The Sword", "The Thrust", and "The Sail".

== Star formation ==
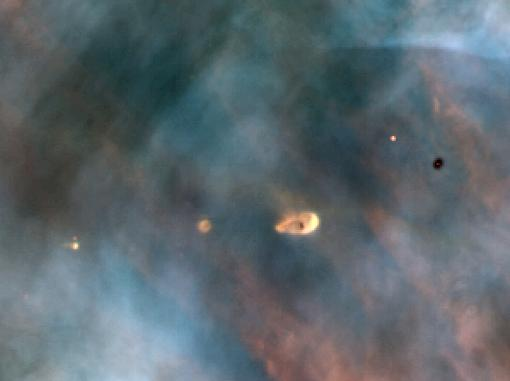
View of several proplyds within the Orion Nebula taken by the Hubble Space Telescope

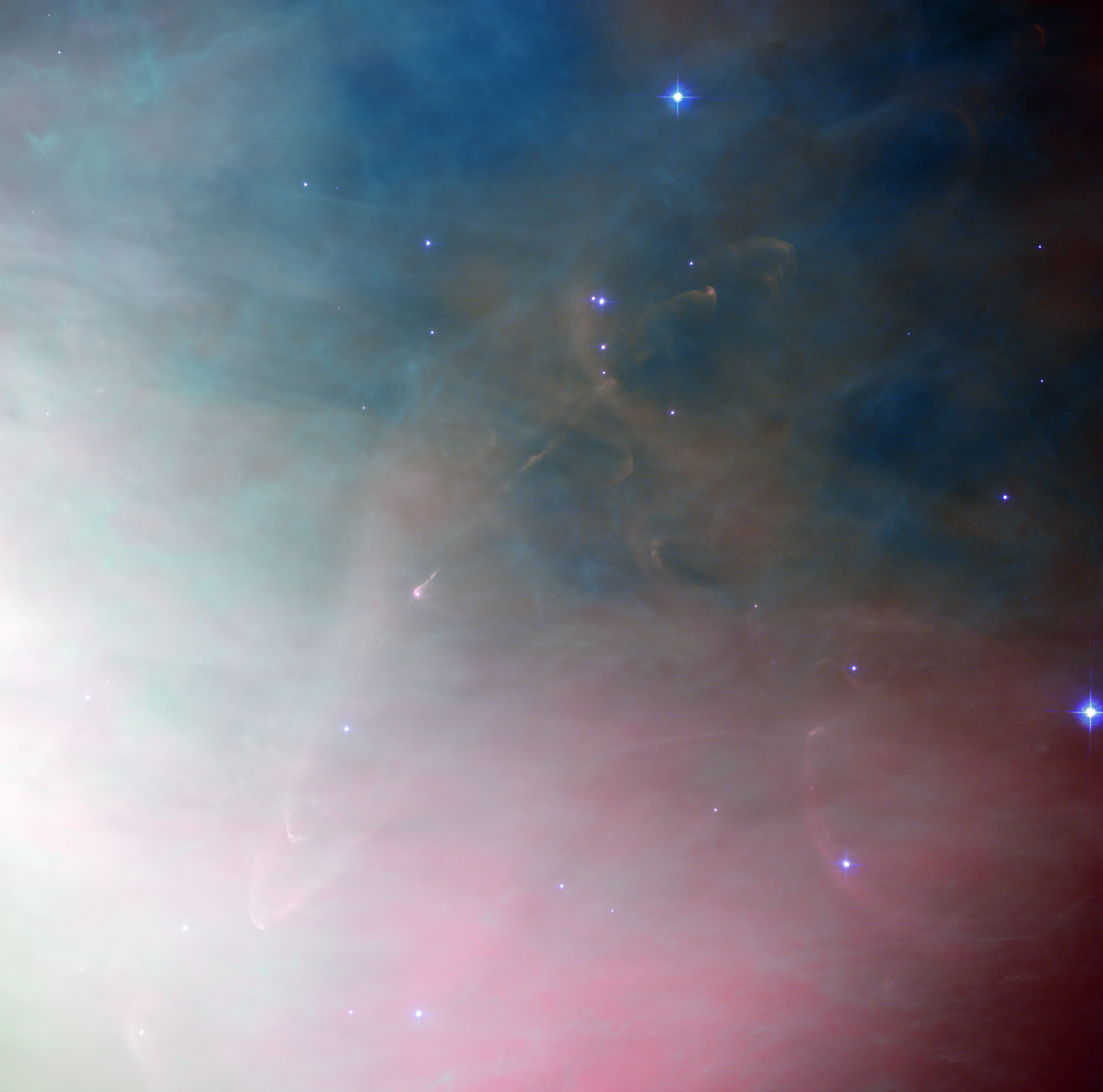
Star Formation Fireworks in Orion

The Orion Nebula is an example of a stellar nursery where new stars are being born. Observations of the nebula have revealed approximately 700 stars in various stages of formation within the nebula.

In 1979 observations with the Lallemand electronic camera at the Pic-du-Midi Observatory showed six unresolved high-ionization sources near the Trapezium Cluster. These sources were interpreted as partly ionized globules (PIGs). The idea was that these objects are being ionized from the outside by M42. Later observations with the Very Large Array showed solar-system-sized condensations associated with these sources. Here the idea appeared that these objects might be low-mass stars surrounded by an evaporating protostellar accretion disk. In 1993 observations with the Hubble Space Telescope have yielded the major confirmation of protoplanetary disks within the Orion Nebula, which have been dubbed proplyds. HST has revealed more than 150 of these within the nebula, and they are considered to be systems in the earliest stages of solar system formation. The sheer number of them have been used as evidence that the formation of planetary systems is fairly common in the universe.

Stars form when clumps of hydrogen and other gases in a molecular cloud contract under their own gravity. As the gas collapses, the central clump grows more dense and the gas heats to extreme temperatures by converting gravitational potential energy to thermal energy. If the temperature gets high enough, nuclear fusion will ignite and form a protostar. The protostar is 'born' when it begins to emit enough radiative energy to balance out its gravity and halt gravitational collapse.

Typically, a cloud of material remains a substantial distance from the star before the fusion reaction ignites. This remnant cloud is the protostar's protoplanetary disk, where planets may form. Recent infrared observations show that protoplanetary disks in the Orion Nebula contain dust grains that are growing, beginning the process of forming planetesimals.

Once the protostar enters into its main sequence phase, it is classified as a star. Even though most planetary disks can form planets, observations show that intense stellar radiation should have destroyed any proplyds that formed near the Trapezium group, if the group is as old as the low mass stars in the cluster. Since proplyds are found very close to the Trapezium group, it can be argued that those stars are much younger than the rest of the cluster members.

=== Stellar wind and effects ===
Once formed, the stars within the nebula emit a stream of charged particles known as a stellar wind. Massive stars and young stars have much stronger stellar winds than the Sun. The wind forms shock waves or hydrodynamical instabilities when it encounters the gas in the nebula, which then shapes the gas clouds. The shock waves from stellar wind also play a large part in stellar formation by compacting the gas clouds, creating density inhomogeneities that lead to gravitational collapse of the cloud.

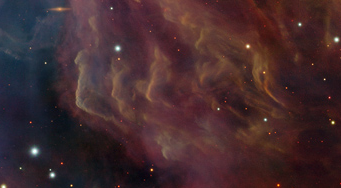
View of the ripples (Kelvin–Helmholtz instability) formed by the action of stellar winds on the cloud.

There are three different kinds of shocks in the Orion Nebula. Many are featured in Herbig–Haro objects:

- Bow shocks are stationary and are formed when two particle streams collide with each other. They are present near the hottest stars in the nebula where the stellar wind speed is estimated to be thousands of kilometers per second and in the outer parts of the nebula where the speeds are tens of kilometers per second. Bow shocks can also form at the front end of stellar jets when the jet hits interstellar particles.
- Jet-driven shocks are formed from jets of material sprouting off newborn T Tauri stars. These narrow streams are traveling at hundreds of kilometers per second and become shocks when they encounter relatively stationary gases.
- Warped shocks appear bow-like to an observer. They are produced when a jet-driven shock encounters gas moving in a cross-current.
- The interaction of the stellar wind with the surrounding cloud also forms "waves" which are believed to be due to the hydrodynamical Kelvin-Helmholtz instability.

The dynamic gas motions in M42 are complex, but are trending out through the opening in the bay and toward the Earth. The large neutral area behind the ionized region is currently contracting under its own gravity.

There are also supersonic 'bullets' of gas piercing the hydrogen clouds of the Orion Nebula. Each bullet is ten times the diameter of Pluto's orbit and tipped with iron atoms glowing in the infrared. They were probably formed one thousand years earlier from an unknown violent event.

== Evolution ==
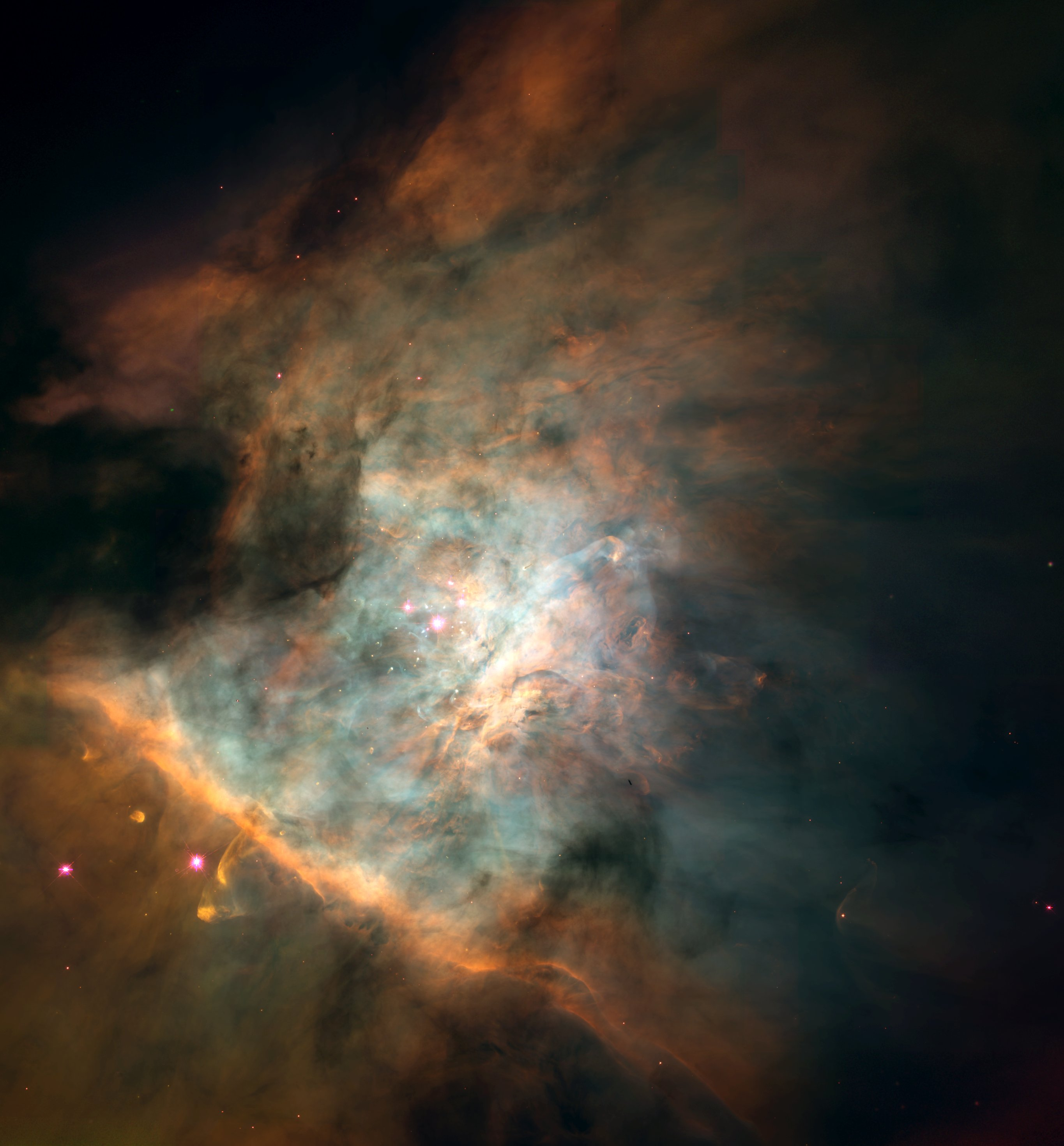
Panoramic image of the center of the nebula, taken by the Hubble Telescope. This view is about 2.5 light years across. The Trapezium is at center left.

Interstellar clouds like the Orion Nebula are found throughout galaxies such as the Milky Way. They begin as gravitationally bound blobs of cold, neutral hydrogen, intermixed with traces of other elements. The cloud can contain hundreds of thousands of solar masses and extend for hundreds of light years. The tiny force of gravity that could compel the cloud to collapse is counterbalanced by the very faint pressure of the gas in the cloud.

Whether due to collisions with a spiral arm, or through the shock wave emitted from supernovae, the atoms are precipitated into heavier molecules and the result is a molecular cloud. This presages the formation of stars within the cloud, usually thought to be within a period of 10–30 million years, as regions pass the Jeans mass and the destabilized volumes collapse into disks. The disk concentrates at the core to form a star, which may be surrounded by a protoplanetary disk. This is the current stage of evolution of the nebula, with additional stars still forming from the collapsing molecular cloud. The youngest and brightest stars we now see in the Orion Nebula are thought to be less than 300,000 years old, and the brightest may be only 10,000 years in age. Some of these collapsing stars can be particularly massive and can emit large quantities of ionizing ultraviolet radiation. An example of this is seen with the Trapezium Cluster. Over time the ultraviolet light from the massive stars at the center of the nebula will push away the surrounding gas and dust in a process called photoevaporation. This process is responsible for creating the interior cavity of the nebula, allowing the stars at the core to be viewed from Earth. The largest of these stars have short life spans and will evolve to become supernovae.

Within about 100,000 years, most of the gas and dust will be ejected. The remains will form a young open cluster: a cluster of bright, young stars surrounded by wispy filaments from the former cloud.

== See also ==
- Barnard's Loop
- Kleinmann–Low Nebula
- Flame Nebula (NGC 2024)
- Horsehead Nebula
- Hubble 3D (2010), an IMAX film with an elaborate CGI fly-through of the Orion Nebula
- List of diffuse nebulae
- List of Messier objects
- Messier 43, which is part of the Orion Nebula
- Messier 78, a reflection nebula
- New General Catalogue
- Orion correlation theory
- Orion molecular cloud complex
- Orion OB1
- Peripheral nebular regions of the Orion Complex
