= Theta Orionis =

The Bayer designation θ Orionis (Theta Orionis) is shared by several astronomical objects, located near RA 05^{h} 35^{m} DEC −05° 24′:

- θ^{1} Orionis (41 Orionis), the Trapezium Cluster, an open star cluster, the Orion OB Association 1d
  - θ^{1} Orionis A (41 Orionis A, HD 37020, V1016 Orionis), a trinary star system
  - θ^{1} Orionis B (41 Orionis B, HD 37021), a six-star system
    - θ^{1} Orionis B West (COUP 766, MAX 97), an astronomical X-ray source
    - θ^{1} Orionis B East (COUP 778, MAX 101), an astronomical X-ray source
  - θ^{1} Orionis C (41 Orionis C, HD 37022), a trinary star system
  - θ^{1} Orionis D (41 Orionis D, HD 37023), a binary star
  - θ^{1} Orionis E (COUP 732), a spectroscopic binary star system
  - θ^{1} Orionis F, a B8 variable star at 11th magnitude with a companion
  - θ^{1} Orionis G (COUP 826, MAX 116), a young stellar object
  - θ^{1} Orionis H (COUP 746, MAX 87), a young stellar object
- θ^{2} Orionis (43 Orionis)
  - θ^{2} Orionis A (43 Orionis, HD 37041), a trinary star
  - θ^{2} Orionis B (HD 37042), a binary star
  - θ^{2} Orionis C (HD 37062), a trinary star system

The various components are spread over several arc-minutes in and near the Orion Nebula.
