= HD 36960 =

Star in the constellation Orion

- Location of HD 36960 (circled)

Observation data Epoch J2000.0 Equinox ICRS
- Constellation: Orion
- Right ascension: 05^{h} 35^{m} 02.68074^{s}
- Declination: −06° 00′ 07.3036″
- Apparent magnitude (V): 4.72

Characteristics
- Spectral type: B0.5 V
- U−B color index: −0.98
- B−V color index: −0.22

Astrometry
Radial velocity (R_{v})	+27.7 km/s
Proper motion (μ)	RA: −0.66 mas/yr Dec.: +0.01 mas/yr
Parallax (π)	2.02±0.31 mas
Distance	approx. 1,600 ly (approx. 500 pc)
Absolute magnitude (M_{V})	−3.18

Details
Mass	15.66 M_{☉}
Radius	5.6 R_{☉}
Luminosity	19,952 L_{☉}
Surface gravity (log g)	4.10 cgs
Temperature	29,000 K
Metallicity [Fe/H]	−0.20 dex
Rotational velocity (v sin i)	28 km/s
Age	6 Myr

Other designations
- HD 36960, HR 1887, HIP 26199, IRAS 05325-0602, BD−06°1234, 2MASS J05350268-0600074, CCDM J05350-0600A, WDS J05350-0600A

Database references
SIMBAD	data

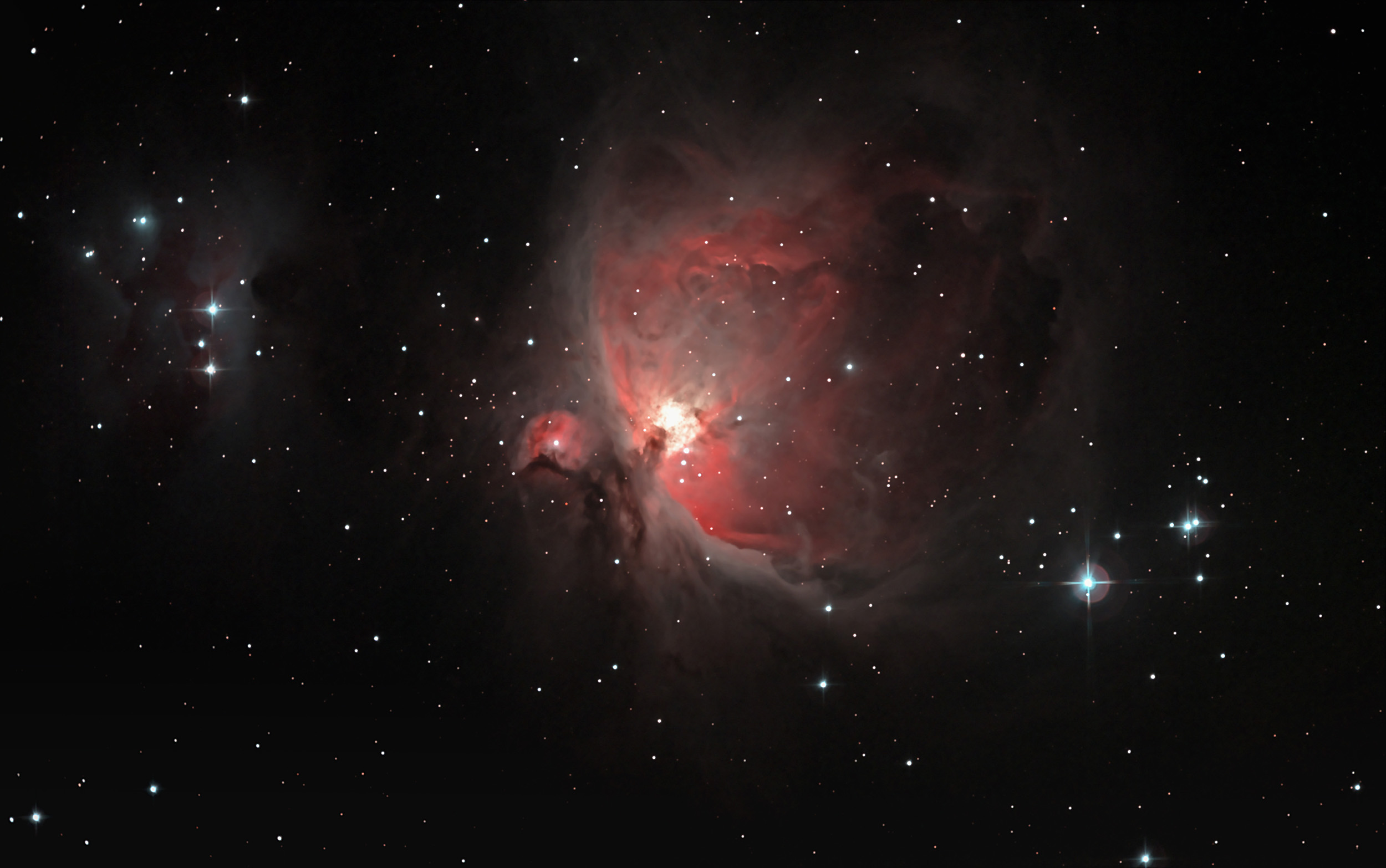
HD 36960 is the brighter member of the close pair to the right of ι Orionis towards the bottom right of the image.

HD 36960 (HR 1887) is a B-type main-sequence star in the constellation Orion. At an apparent magnitude of +4.78 it is easily visible to the naked eye in many areas, though in most urban areas it cannot be seen due to light pollution. Although it does not have a Bayer or Flamsteed designation, it is brighter than over 30 Flamsteed stars in Orion, as well as being brighter than any of the stars in the nearby Orion Nebula such as θ^{1} Orionis C and θ^{2} Orionis.

HD 36960 forms a close pair with the slightly fainter HD 36959 36" away. Multiple star catalogues also list the 9th magnitude BD-06°1233 as part of the system. HD 36959 is itself a very close binary with a 9th magnitude companion. All these stars are likely members of open cluster NGC 1980 which includes ι Orionis 7' away.

At over 15 solar masses, it shines with around 20,000 times the Sun's luminosity due to its high surface temperature of 29,000 K and radius over five times that of the sun. It is calculated to be around six million years old, consistent with other stars thought to be members of NGC 1980.
