= Orion OB1 =

Hot giant star group

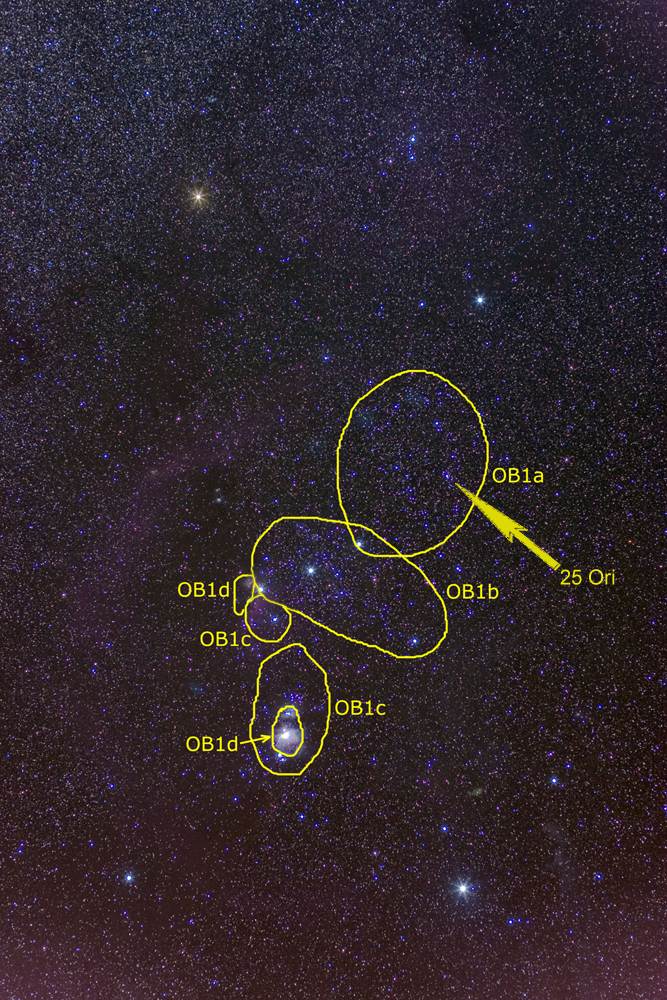

Observation data (J2000 epoch)
- Constellation: Orion
- Right ascension: 05^{h} 36^{m}
- Declination: −01° 12′
- Mean distance: 1040–1630 ly (320–500 pc)

Physical characteristics
- Age: ~10 Myr
- Mass: >8.0×10^{3} M_{☉}

Orion OB1 (Ori OB1) is a contingent group of several dozen hot giant stars of spectral types O and B in Orion. Associated are thousands of lower-mass stars, and a (smaller but significant) number of protostars. It is part of the larger Orion molecular cloud complex. Owing to its relative closeness and complexity it is the most closely studied OB association.

The Orion OB1 consists of the following subgroups:

- Orion OB1a – the group of stars northwest of the Orion Belt stars with an average age of about 12 million years. Within this grouping is another subgroup known as the 25 Orionis group. They are located near the star of Bellatrix.
- Orion OB1b – the three bright stars ζ Ori (Alnitak), ε Ori (Alnilam), and δ Ori (Mintaka) which make up the asterism known as "Orion's Belt", and minor stars. This group has an average age of approximately 8 million years and is further subdivided into three subgroups.
- Orion OB1c – the stars in Orion's Sword that are created by 42 Orionis, θ Orionis, and ι Orionis. These stars are about 3–6 million years old.
- Orion OB1d – the stars of the Orion Nebula and M43 (the youngest stars)

Signatures of stellar debris disk evolution have been detected in the 1a and 1b subgroups.

== See also ==
- Orion's Belt
