= Theta1 Orionis D =

Star in the constellation Orion

θ^{1} Orionis D
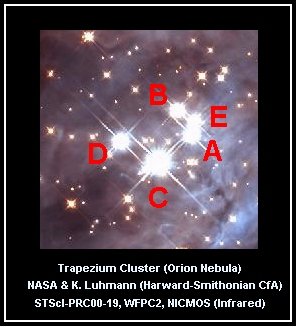
- Theta^{1} Orionis D and companions in the Trapezium cluster

Observation data Epoch J2000 Equinox ICRS
- Constellation: Orion
- Right ascension: 05^{h} 35^{m} 17.24645^{s}
- Declination: −05° 23′ 16.5707″
- Apparent magnitude (V): 6.70

Characteristics
- Spectral type: B1.5V + B
- U−B color index: −0.71
- B−V color index: +0.09

Astrometry
Radial velocity (R_{v})	+32.4 km/s
Proper motion (μ)	RA: +1.822 mas/yr Dec.: −0.393 mas/yr
Parallax (π)	2.2820±0.0207 mas
Distance	1,430 ± 10 ly (438 ± 4 pc)
Absolute magnitude (M_{V})	−3.3

Orbit
Primary	θ^{1} Orionis D_{1}
Name	θ^{1} Orionis D_{3}
Period (P)	0.1452 ± 0.0002 years (53.034 ± 0.073 days)
Semi-major axis (a)	(1.86±0.06)×10^{−3}" (0.77±0.03 au)
Eccentricity (e)	0.43±0.03
Inclination (i)	160±12°
Longitude of the node (Ω)	346±24°
Periastron epoch (T)	2017.101±0.001
Argument of periastron (ω) (secondary)	166±27°

Details

θ^{1} Orionis D_{1}
Mass	16±1 M_{☉}
Radius	5.6±0.8 R_{☉}
Luminosity	29,500 L_{☉}
Surface gravity (log g)	4.2±0.1 cgs
Temperature	32,000±1,000 K
Rotational velocity (v sin i)	49.0±0.9 km/s
Age	2.5±0.5 Myr

θ^{1} Orionis D_{3}
Mass	6±1 M_{☉}

Other designations
- θ^{1} Orionis D, 41 Orionis D, HR 1896, HD 37023, HIP 26224, WDS J05353-0523D

Database references
SIMBAD	data

Theta^{1} Orionis D (θ^{1} Orionis D) is a binary star system that is part of the Trapezium open cluster that lies within the Orion Nebula.

θ^{1} Orionis consists of multiple components, primarily the four stars of the Trapezium cluster (A, B, C, and D) all within one arc-minute of each other. θ^{2} Orionis is a more distant grouping of three main stars plus several fainter companions, 1-2 arc-minutes from θ^{1}.

== Characteristics ==
θ^{1} D is a spectroscopic binary with an orbital period of 53.03±0.07 d. The two components are named θ^{1} Orionis D_{1} and θ^{1} Orionis D_{3}. D_{1} is a B-type main-sequence star of spectral type B1.5V and a mass 16 times that of the Sun. D_{3} is a B-type star, with a mass six times solar and a brightness 1.15 times fainter than the primary in the K-band.

There is a more widely-separated companion 1.4" away (projected separation of 580±10 au), although it is not confirmed to be gravitationally bound. It has an estimated mass of 1.1±0.1 M_{☉}. Infrared Optical Telescope Array observations suggest another companion at 18.6 mas, which was not confirmed with GRAVITY observations.
