= NGC 1990 =

Nebula in the constellation of Orion

Emission nebula
- H II region
- reflection nebula
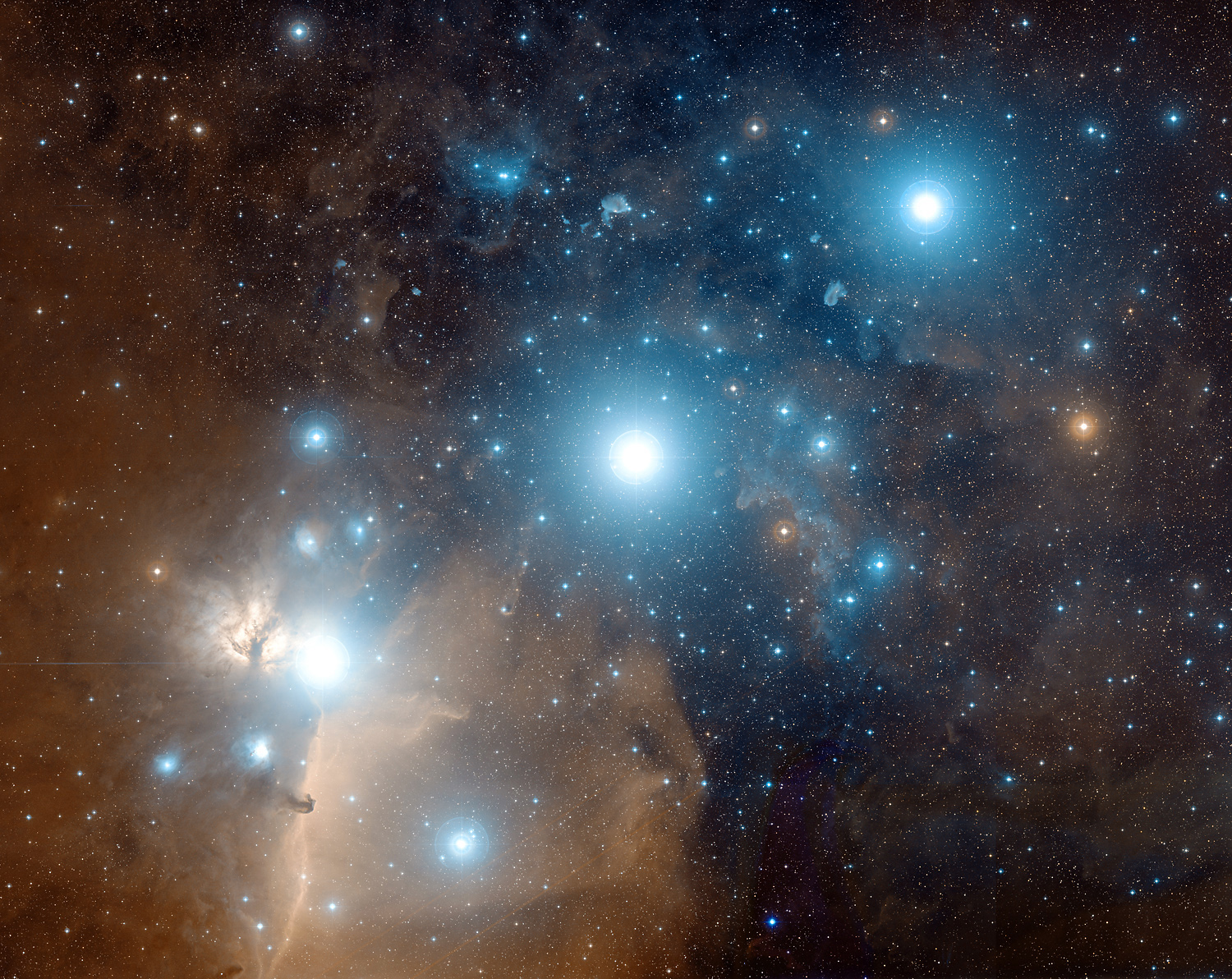
- Nebulosity near around Orion's Belt

Observation data: J2000 epoch
- Right ascension: 05^{h} 36^{m} 16.2^{s}
- Declination: −01° 12′ 07″
- Constellation: Orion

NGC 1990 was discovered by William Herschel in 1786 with an 18.7 inch telescope. However, there is doubt that this object exists in reality, as several visual searches and modern astrophotography have failed to identify the exact location and extent of the reflection nebula. Modern photographs of the area with cameras show ultraviolet leak that gives the false impression of a large blue nebula around ε Ori (Alnilam). More careful photography does not reveal a nebula in the area. Visual surveys do not reveal the nebula either.
