= Orion's Sword =

Asterism in the constellation Orion

Orion's Sword is a compact asterism in the constellation Orion. It comprises three stars (42 Orionis, Theta Orionis, and Iota Orionis) and M42, the Orion Nebula, which together are thought to resemble a sword or its scabbard. This group is south of the prominent asterism, Orion's Belt. Fables and old beliefs are in Europe dominated or widely influenced by those of the Greco-Roman narratives. Beyond Europe this grouping is quite widely referenced as a weapon just as the majority of cultures perceived Orion's standout asymmetrical "hourglass" of seven very bright stars as a human.

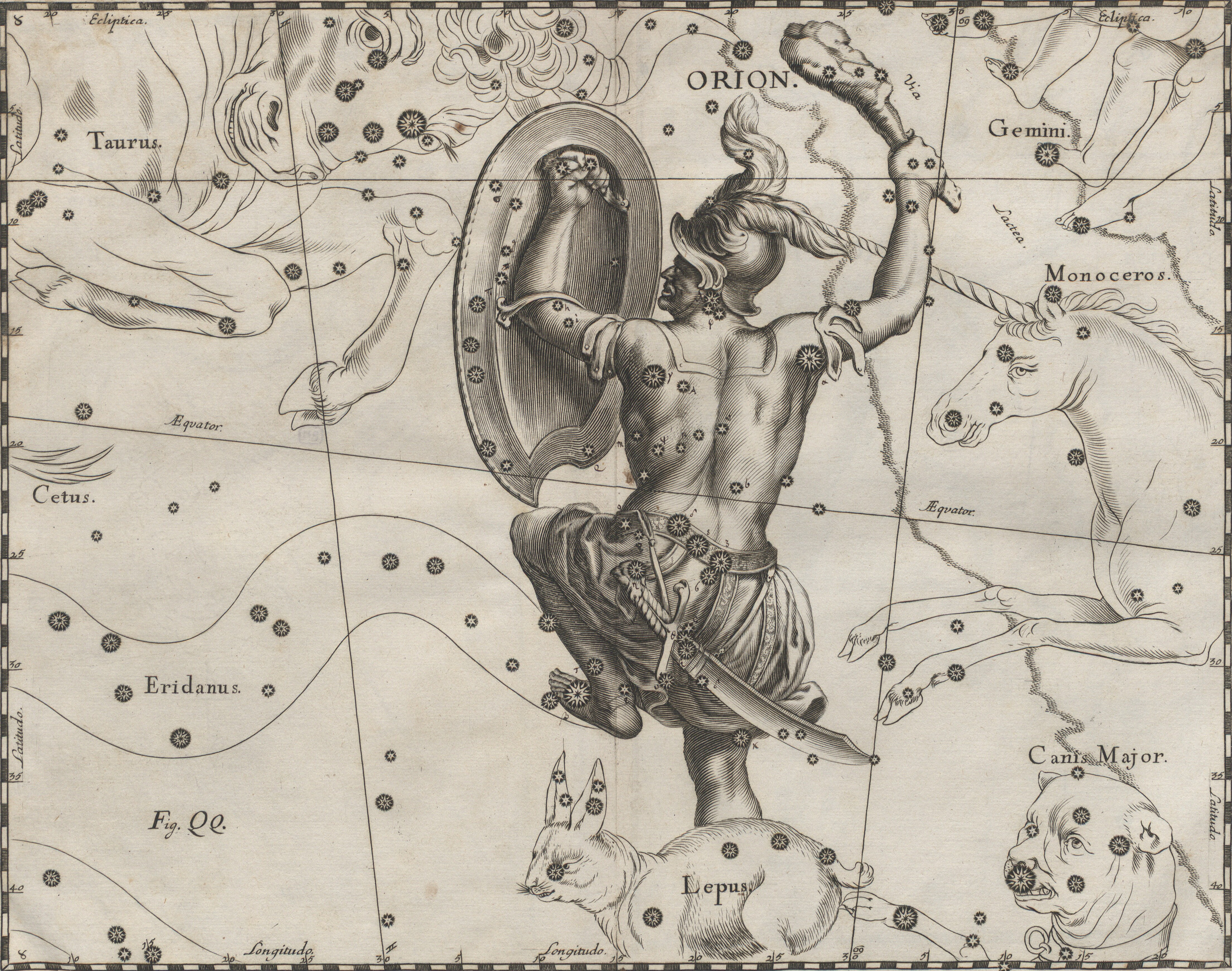
An illustration of the hunter Orion, with the associated constellation.

== Components ==
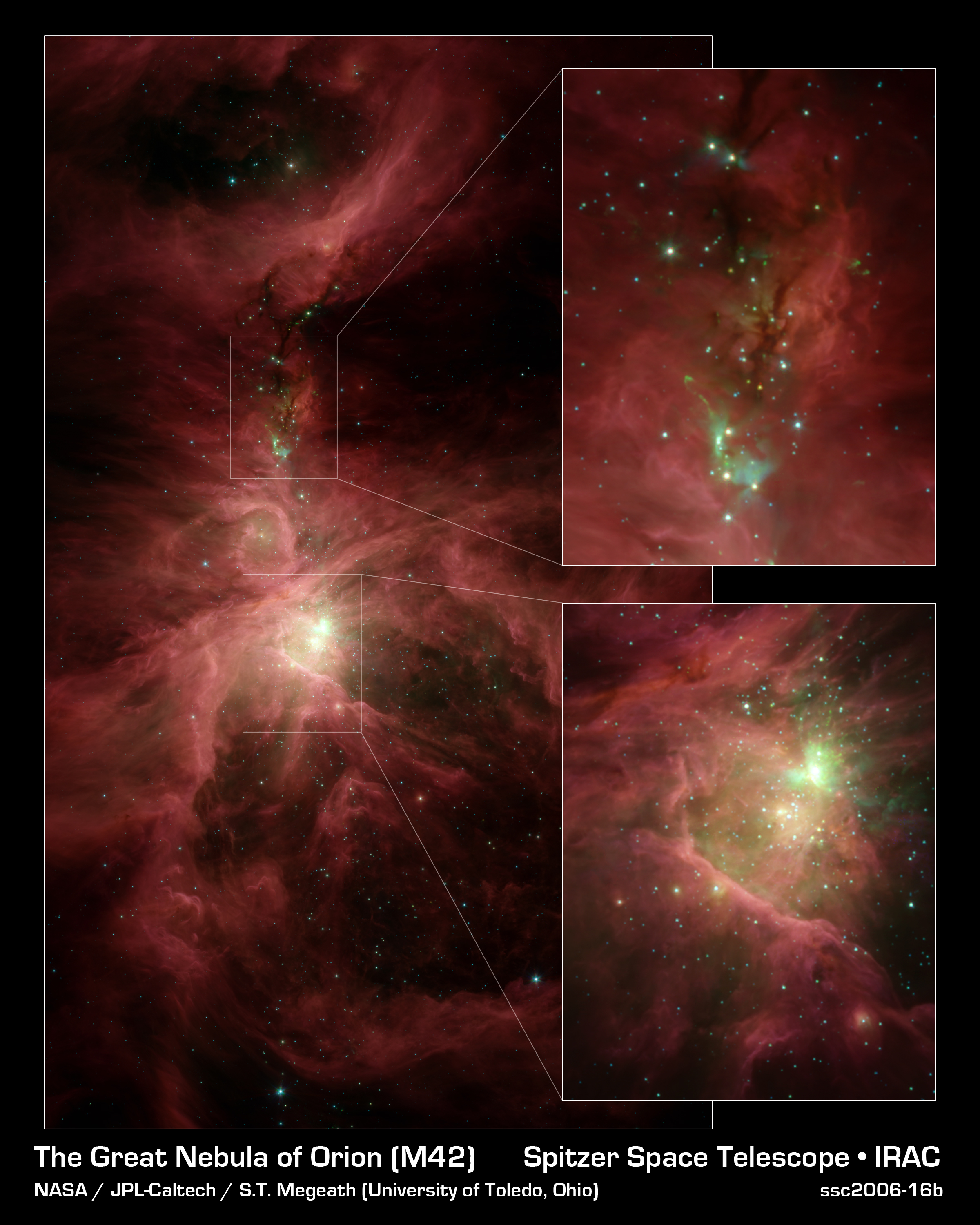
Orion Nebula and the surrounding stars that constitute Orion's Sword. The nebula hosts a stellar nursery, leading to the birth of multiple hot, young stars that make Orion's Sword so distinctive.

=== Orion Nebula ===
The Orion Nebula consists of one of the nearest (thus in the Milky Way Galaxy), massive molecular clouds (30 - 40 light years in diameter) about 1,300 light years from the Solar System. This makes the nebula potentially the closest HII region to Earth, a mass of hydrogen that has been ionized by nearby, hot, young stars. Regions like this are called stellar nurseries, nurturing the birth of multiple young stars such as the Orion Nebula Star Cluster. These are a hallmark of the asterism.

=== Main stars ===
42 Orionis, also called c Ori, is a B1V magnitude star in the northern half of the Orion nebula. Theta Orionis has a more central position in the nebula, and is actually composed of a multi-star system. Iota Orionis is one of the brightest in the collection, in the south of the Orion nebula. Iota Orionis is a spectroscopic binary system, with a variable magnitude of O9III.

== Scientific studies ==
Given the scientific significance of M42, Orion's Sword is a popular spot for stellar and protostellar studies. Using the Hubble Space Telescope, O'dell et al. focused on identifying previously unseen features of the nebula, such as high-ionization shocks, compact sources, and protoplanetary disks. Some studies have focused on the sword region overall. Gomez & Leda found that less than half of the OB and Hα stars in this region are associated with well-defined stellar clusters. This positional similarity, as well as the high star formation rates and gas pressure in the nearby molecular cloud, confirms the previous notion that old, foreground OB stars triggered star formation in this cloud.

== References in history and culture ==
Hyginus described three faint stars where the sword is depicted in the constellation Orion, in his book De Astronomia. Aratus goes into significant detail about the Orion constellation as well, proclaiming: "Should anyone fail to catch sight of him (Orion) up in the heavens on a clear night, he should not expect to behold anything more splendid when he gazes up at the sky." Cicero and Germanicus, the translators of Aratus's Phaenomena, expressed it as ensis, Latin for "sword". Arabic astronomers also saw this asterism as a sword (سيف saif), calling it Saif al Jabbār ("sword of the powerful one" or "sword of the giant"). Orion is one of the few constellations to have parallel identities in European and Chinese culture, given the name Shen, the hunter and warrior. Chinese astronomers made the sword a sub-constellation within Shen called Fa.

In the myths of the Nama of Namibia and the western Cape, this was the arrow of the husband of the Pleiades, daughters of the sky god, who was represented by Orion's SW main star Rigel. When he fired his arrow at three zebras (Orion's belt) and missed; he was too afraid to retrieve the arrow due to its proximity to a fierce lion, represented by Betelgeuse. Therefore, he sits in the cold, suffering from hunger but too ashamed to return home. Regionally the prevailing cold breezes and currents come from that direction. The Tswana to the east traditionally call the unusually bright nebula and its companions dintsa le Dikolobe, three dogs which chase the three pigs (the belt). This serves as an etiological myth for why pigs have their litters in the same season Orion is prominent in the sky.

Orion's sword is referenced in the song "The Dark of the Sun" by Tom Petty on his 1991 album Into the Great Wide Open, in the line "saw you sail across a river underneath Orion's sword ...". It is also mentioned in Jethro Tull's song "Orion", on their 1979 album Stormwatch, in the lines "Your faithful dog shines brighter than its lord and master, your jewelled sword twinkles as the world rolls by."

== Gallery ==
The Orion constellation, with Orion's sword distinguished by M42.

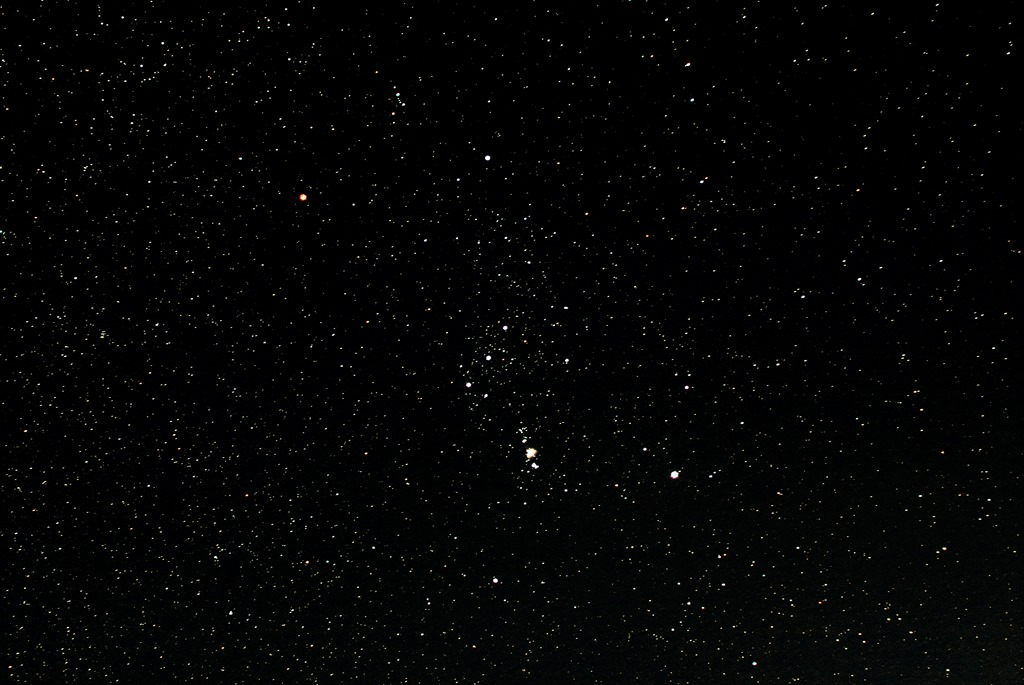
How Orion appears in a clear sky. M42, and thus Orion's sword, is one of the brightest and most prominent features of the constellation.

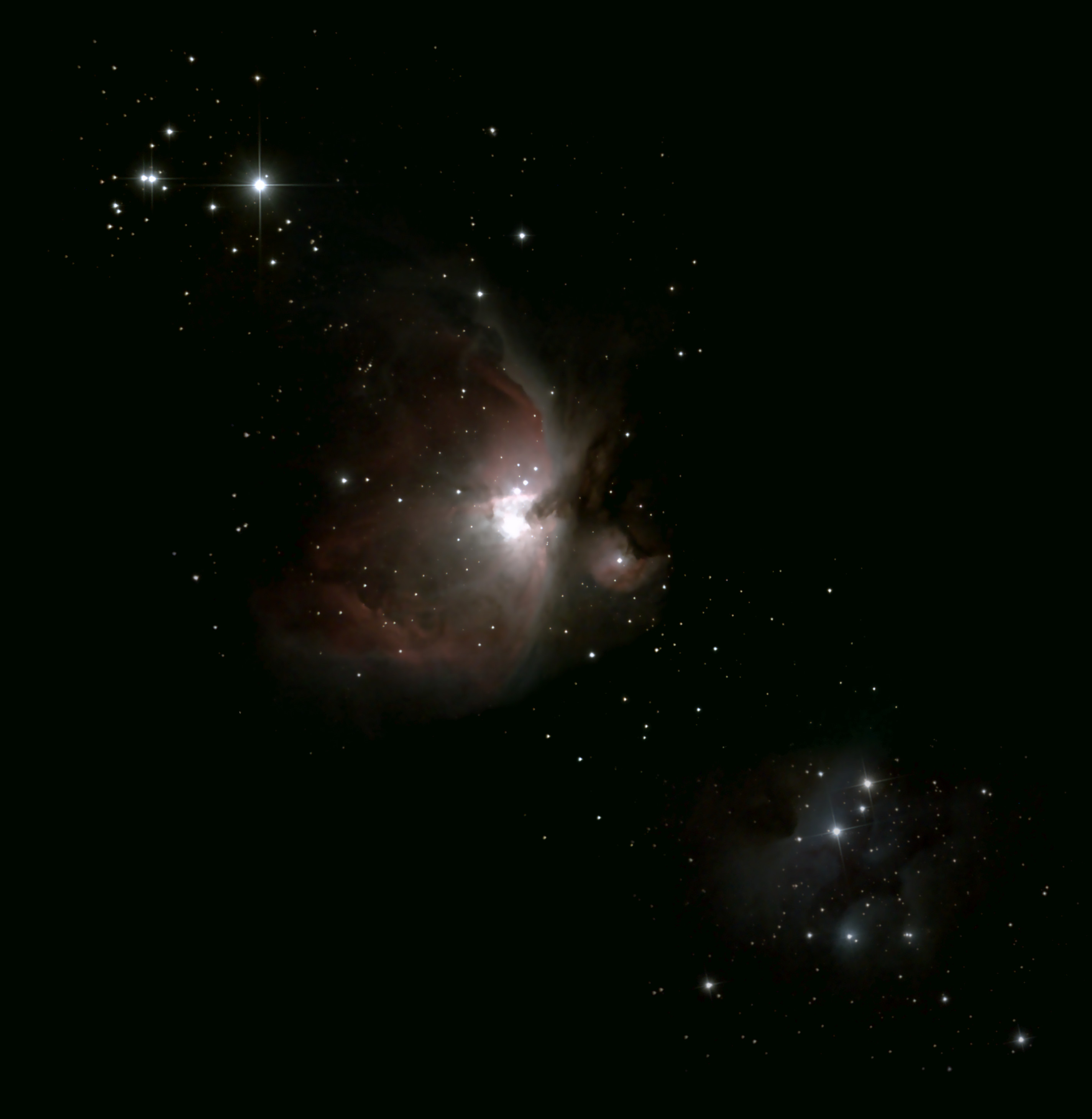
The Orion Sword observed from Australia (stitching of 3 observations made with a Unistellar eVscope)

== See also ==
- Orion (constellation)
- Orion's Belt
- Thornborough Henges
- Orion Correlation Theory
