= Theta1 Orionis A =

Star in the constellation Orion

θ^{1} Orionis A
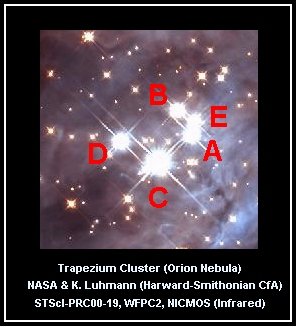
- Trapezium stars

Observation data Epoch J2000 Equinox ICRS
- Constellation: Orion
- Right ascension: 05^{h} 35^{m} 15.84743^{s}
- Declination: −05° 23′ 14.3441″
- Apparent magnitude (V): 6.72 - 7.65

Characteristics
- Spectral type: B0.5V + G + F PMS
- Variable type: Algol

Astrometry
Radial velocity (R_{v})	32.354±0.062 km/s
Proper motion (μ)	RA: 4.81±0.10 mas/yr Dec.: −2.53±0.12 mas/yr
Parallax (π)	2.626±0.100 mas
Distance	1,272.0 ± 6.5 ly (390±2 pc)
Absolute magnitude (M_{V})	−2.80

Orbit
Primary	A_{1}
Name	A_{3}
Period (P)	65.433300±0.000019 days
Semi-major axis (a)	178.56 ± 0.45 R_{☉} (0.8304 ± 0.0021 au)
Eccentricity (e)	0.64383±0.00029
Inclination (i)	87.090±0.014°
Periastron epoch (T)	2,459,441.257±0.016 HJD
Argument of periastron (ω) (secondary)	177.88±0.06°
Semi-amplitude (K_{1}) (primary)	28.499±0.082 km/s
Semi-amplitude (K_{2}) (secondary)	151.43±0.76 km/s

Details

A_{1}
Mass	15.01±0.32 M_{☉}
Radius	4.20±0.05 R_{☉}
Luminosity	15,800+3,200 −2,700 L_{☉}
Surface gravity (log g)	4.37±0.01 cgs
Temperature	30,500±800 K
Age	0.7 Myr

A_{3}
Mass	2.825±0.145 M_{☉}
Radius	6.415±0.055 R_{☉}
Luminosity	54+11 −9 L_{☉}
Surface gravity (log g)	3.28±0.04 cgs
Temperature	5,550±500 K
Age	0.7 Myr

A_{2}
Mass	4 M_{☉}

Other designations
- 41 Ori A, V1016 Ori, BD−05 1315A, HD 37020, HIP 26220, HR 1893

Database references
SIMBAD	data

Theta^{1} Orionis A (θ^{1} Ori A) is a trinary star in the constellation Orion. The system consists of an close pair of eclipsing stars orbited by a visual companion farther away. Its apparent magnitude range is 6.72 to 7.65 with a period of 65.432 days. It is one of the main stars in The Trapezium in Orion, along with B, C, and D, as well as the fainter E.

== Variability ==
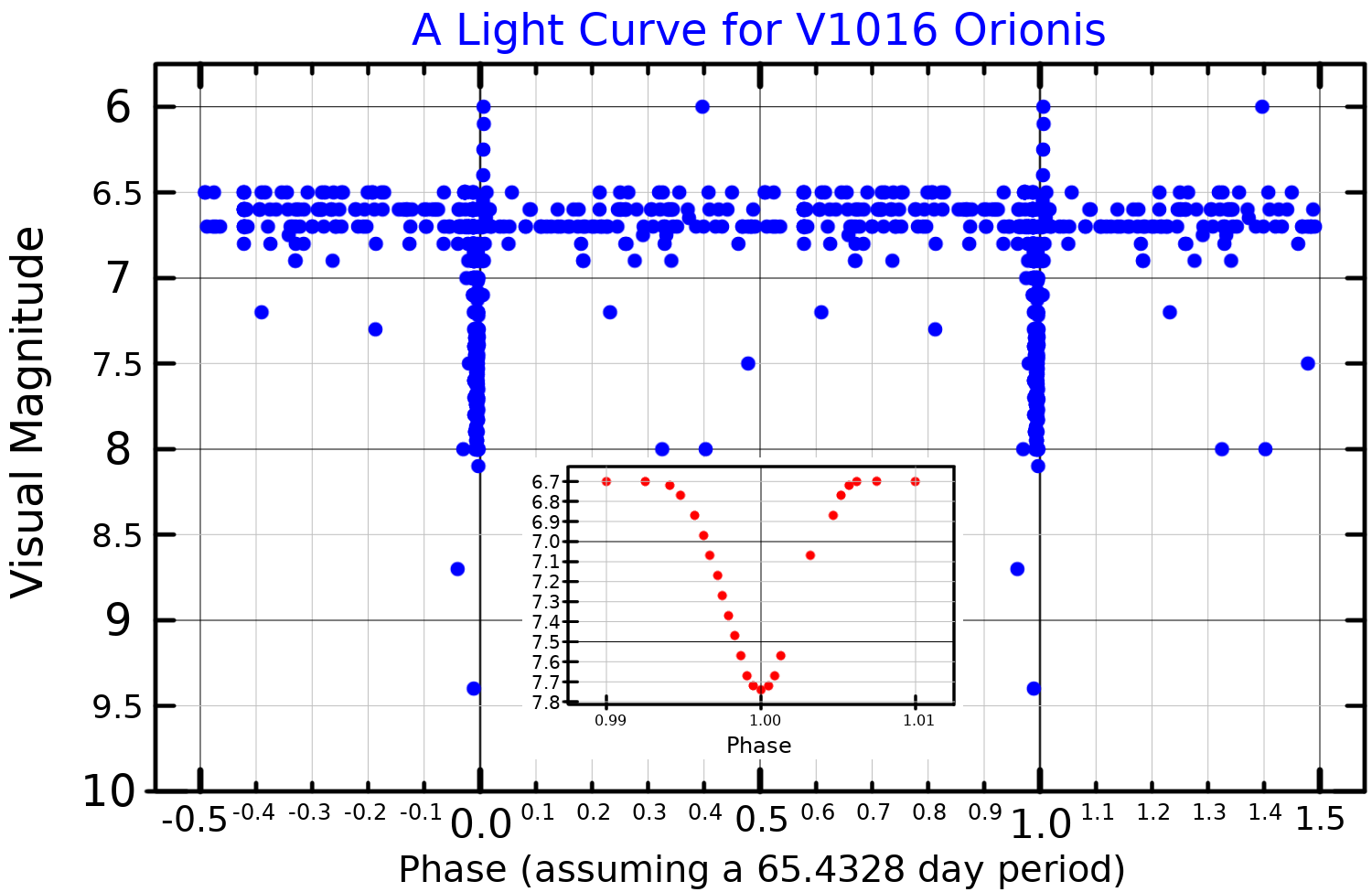
A visual band light curve for V1016 Orionis, plotted from AAVSO data. The inset plot, adapted from Lloyd and Stickland (1999), shows the time around the eclipse minimum with an expanded scale.

θ^{1} Orionis A varies in brightness, showing dips from magnitude 6.72 to 7.65 every 65.432 days. These are caused by eclipses of the central pair. θ^{1} Orionis A has been assigned the variable star designation V1016 Orionis.

== System ==
θ^{1} Orionis A_{1} and θ^{1} Orionis A_{3} form an eclipsing binary system, where only the primary is detected in the spectrum. The components orbit around each other with an orbital period of roughly 65.4 days, following a highly-eccentric path with a semi-major axis of 0.8304 ± 0.0021 au and an eccentricity of 0.644. The primary is an B0.5V star with a temperature of 30,500 K, 15 times the mass of the Sun, 4.2 times the Sun's radius, and a luminosity 16,000 times solar. The secondary has been proposed to be a T Tauri star, possibly of spectral class A, but later confirmed to be of spectral class G with a temperature of 5,600±500 K. It has a mass 2.8 times solar and an inflated radius of 6.4 times that of the Sun, radiating a luminosity 54 times brighter than the Sun's.

θ^{1} Orionis A_{2} is an F-type pre-main-sequence star, 1.63 fainter than the inner pair in the K band and with an estimated mass of 4 solar masses. It was proven to be gravitationally bound to the system in 2018 using long-term astrometric measurements. Its separation from the inner pair has changed from 0.227" in 1995 to 0.193" in late 2011. At the system's distance, the angular separations correspond to a projected separation of 90–100 AU. Its orbital period has been determined at 214 years.
