= Theta1 Orionis B =

Variable quadruple star system in the constellation Orion

θ^{1} Orionis B
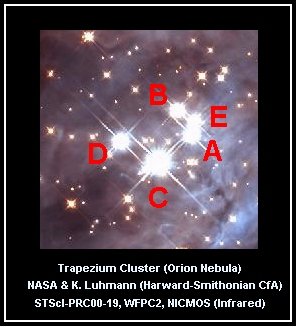
- θ^{1} Orionis B and nearby stars in the Trapezium Cluster

Observation data Epoch J2000 Equinox ICRS
- Constellation: Orion
- Right ascension: 05^{h} 35^{m} 16.134^{s}
- Declination: −05° 23′ 6.78″
- Apparent magnitude (V): 7.90 (- 7.98) - 8.65

Characteristics
- Spectral type: B1V (B_{1}) + B (B_{6})
- Variable type: Algol

Astrometry
Radial velocity (R_{v})	26 km/s
Proper motion (μ)	RA: +1.280 mas/yr Dec.: +1.278 mas/yr
Parallax (π)	2.6548±0.0424 mas
Distance	1,230 ± 20 ly (377 ± 6 pc)
Absolute magnitude (M_{V})	−0.80

Orbit
Primary	B_{1}
Name	B_{5}
Period (P)	6.471 days
Semi-major axis (a)	0.120±0.002 au
Semi-amplitude (K_{1}) (primary)	52.8 km/s
Semi-amplitude (K_{2}) (secondary)	171 km/s

Details

B_{1}
Mass	7.2±0.2 M_{☉}
Radius	3 R_{☉}
Luminosity	776 L_{☉}
Temperature	19,320 K
Rotational velocity (v sin i)	170 km/s

B_{5}
Mass	2 M_{☉}
Radius	8.4 R_{☉}
Luminosity	80 L_{☉}
Surface gravity (log g)	3.0 cgs
Temperature	5,740 K
Rotational velocity (v sin i)	60 km/s

B_{2}
Mass	3 M_{☉}

B_{3}
Mass	2.5 M_{☉}

B_{4}
Mass	1 M_{☉}

B_{6}
Mass	4–6 M_{☉}

Other designations
- 41 Orionis B, BM Orionis, HD 37021, HR 1894, TYC 4774-954-1, 2MASS J05351611-0523068

Database references
SIMBAD	data

Theta^{1} Orionis B (θ^{1} Orionis B), also known as BM Orionis, is a multiple star system containing six members. It is also one of the main stars of the Trapezium Cluster, with the others being A, C, and D. The primary is an eclipsing variable and one of the youngest known eclipsing binary systems.

== Variability ==
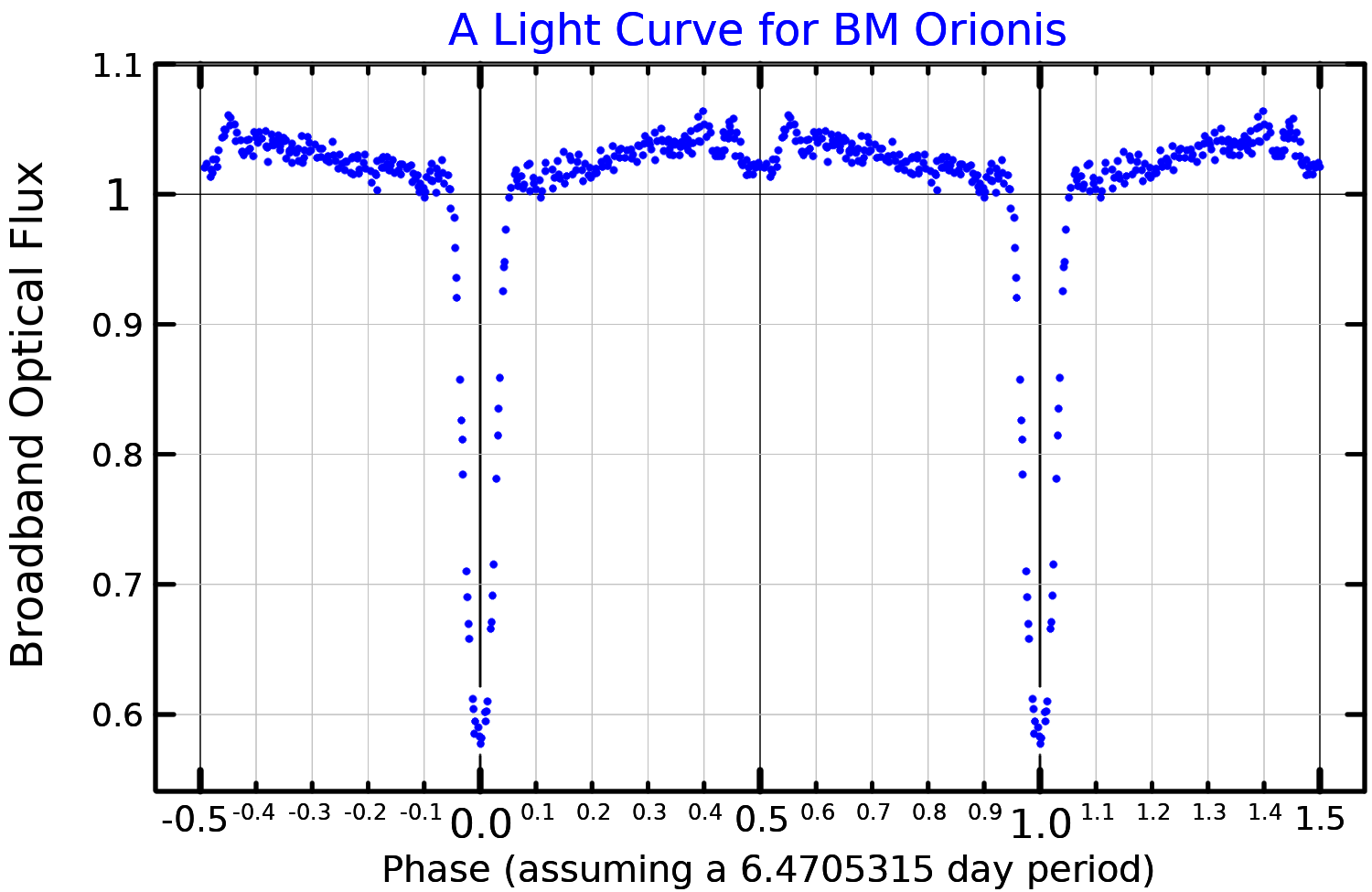
A broadband optical light curve for BM Orionis, adapted from Windemuth et al. (2013)

θ^{1} Orionis B varies in brightness and has been given the variable star designation BM Orionis. Every 6.47 days, it drops from magnitude 7.90 to a minimum of magnitude 8.65 for 8–9 hours. It was quickly classified as an eclipsing variable showing total eclipses of the brighter component, an Algol-type variable. In between the primary eclipses, there are slight brightness variations attributed to reflection effects, and a shallow secondary eclipse of less than a tenth of a magnitude.

Although the light curve appears straightforward, it shows variations in the shape of the eclipse from cycle to cycle and the properties of the eclipsing component cannot easily be reconciled with the light curve.

== Mini-cluster ==
θ^{1} Orionis B has been resolved into four stars. Conventionally, the brightest star is known as B_{1}, while the companions are known as B_{2}, B_{3}, B_{4}, B_{5} and B_{6}. B_{2} and B_{3} are only just over 0.1" apart, and the two are 0.9" from B_{1}. B_{6} has a separation between 8.5 and 17.2 mas from B_{1}, implying a projected separation of 3.52–7.12 au at the system's distance. B_{2} is approximately two magnitudes fainter than B_{1}, and B_{3} another magnitude fainter. In between, B_{4} is 0.6" from B_{1} and five magnitudes fainter.

The brightest component, B_{1}, is known to be an eclipsing binary and its unresolved companion is generally called B_{5}. A third component of the eclipsing system has been proposed to account for unusual variations in the timing of the eclipses, but is not yet widely accepted. The unseen companion is likely to be a pre-main-sequence star with an age of between 10,000 and 100,000 years, making it one of the least-evolved stars known. As of 2013, the pair were considered to be the youngest known eclipsing binary.

The stars making up θ^{1} Orionis B are gravitationally bound, but their configuration is likely to be unstable and will eventually decay. Only the close B_{1}/B_{5} binary will remain after a few million years.

== Properties ==
θ^{1} Orionis B_{1} is a hot main sequence star with a spectral type of B1. Its spectroscopic companion B^{5} is estimated to have a spectral type of G2 III from observations during the total eclipses. The unusual and changeable eclipses are thought to be caused by a translucent disc surrounding the secondary star. It is seen nearly edge-on and variations in its opacity cause differences in the light curve shape.
