= Orion's Belt =

Asterism of three stars within the constellation of Orion

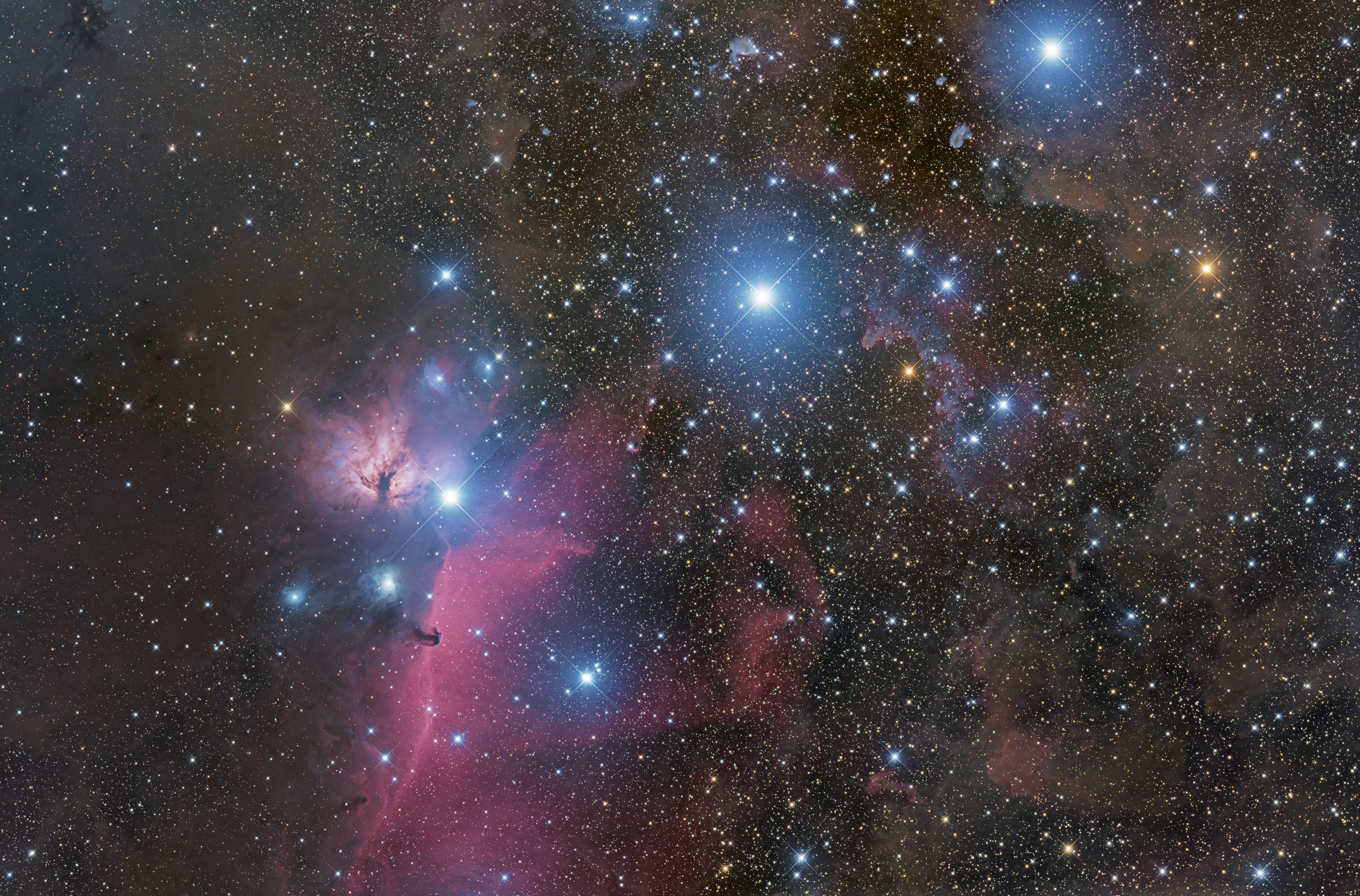
- Orion's Belt and nebulosity, including the Flame Nebula (left) and Horsehead Nebula (lower left) named after a relatively small dark cloud, rotated 90° somewhat resembling a seahorse

Observation data
- Right ascension: 05^{h} 00^{m} 00^{s}
- Declination: −05° 00′ 00″

Physical characteristics

Associations
- Constellation: Orion

Orion's Belt is an asterism in the constellation of Orion. Other names include the Belt of Orion, the Three Kings, and the Three Sisters. The belt consists of three bright and easily identifiable collinear star systems – Alnitak, Alnilam, and Mintaka – appearing from Earth to be nearly equally spaced in a line, spanning an angular size of ~140′ (2.3°).

Owing to the high surface temperatures of their constituent stars, the intense light emitted is blue-white in color. In spite of their spot-like appearance, only Alnilam is a single star; Alnitak is a triple star system, and Mintaka is a quintuple. All three owe their luminosity to the presence of one or more blue supergiants. The brightest as viewed from the Sun is Alnilam, with an apparent magnitude of 1.7, followed by Alnitak at 2.05 and Mintaka at 2.23. The ten stars of the three systems have a combined luminosity approximately a million times that of the Sun.

Orion's Belt appears widely in historical literature and in various cultures, under many different names. It has played a central role in astral navigation in the Northern hemisphere since prehistoric times. It is considered to be among the most documented asterisms in the night sky. It is not visible during summer, when the Sun is too visually close.

== Belt features ==
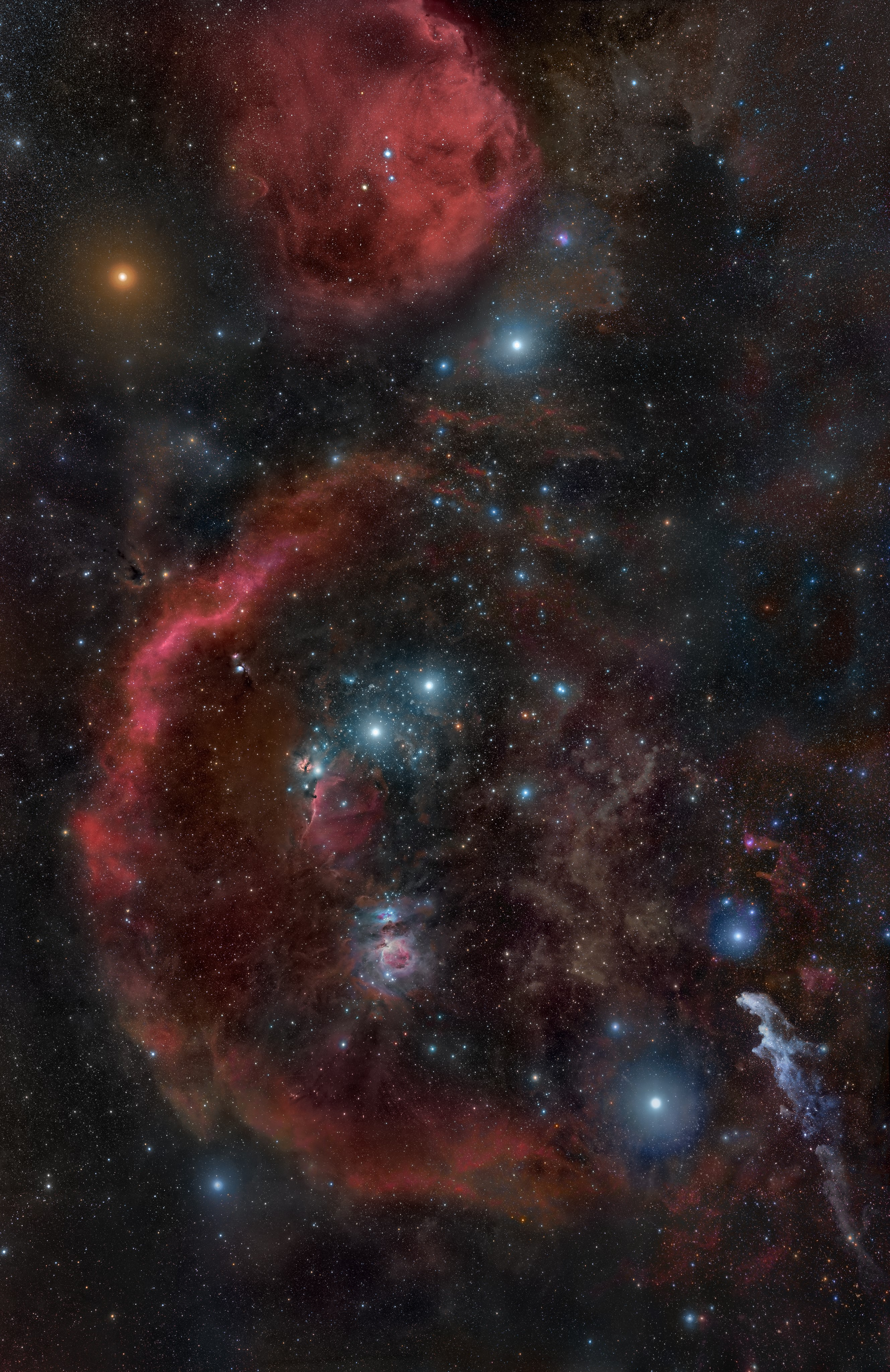
In this broader view, the belt (the line of three stars in the center) is seen in relation to nearby features in Orion.

The names of the three stars that comprise the belt derive from Arabic. All three were once known as Al Niṭhām (النظام) meaning "string of pearls" with spelling variants that include Alnihan and Ainilam, which was suggested by Knobel to be mistakes in transliteration or copy errors.

=== Alnitak ===
Alnitak (ζ Orionis) is a triple star system at the eastern end of Orion's belt and is 1,260 light-years from the Earth. Alnitak B is a 4th-magnitude B-type star which orbits Alnitak A every 1,500 years. The primary (Alnitak A) is itself a close binary, comprising Alnitak Aa (a blue supergiant of spectral type O9.7 Ibe and an apparent magnitude of 2.0) and Alnitak Ab (a blue subgiant of spectral type B1IV and an apparent magnitude of about 4). Alnitak Aa is estimated to be up to 28 times as massive as the Sun and has a diameter 20 times greater. It is the brightest star of class O in the night sky.

=== Alnilam ===
Alnilam (ε Orionis) is a singular B0 supergiant, approximately 1,250 light-years away from Earth and magnitude 1.69. It is the 29th-brightest star in the sky and the fourth-brightest in Orion. It is 375,000 times more luminous than the Sun. Its spectrum serves as one of the stable anchor points by which other stars are classified.

=== Mintaka ===
Mintaka (δ Orionis) is a five-star system at the western end of the Belt, and the star system closest to the celestial equator. It is the nearest massive multiple stellar system, composed of three spectroscopic components. The most luminous individual star is a O9.5 II blue giant. Together, the system has a combined ~250,000 solar luminosity. Mintaka is 1,200 light-years distant, with a visual magnitude of 2.25. The innermost binary has a period of 5.732 days and a semi-major axis of approximately 32 million kilometers (0.22 AU), with the two massive stars eclipsing each other twice per completed orbit as viewed from Sol, from which regular minor dips in brightness arise.

== References in history and culture ==
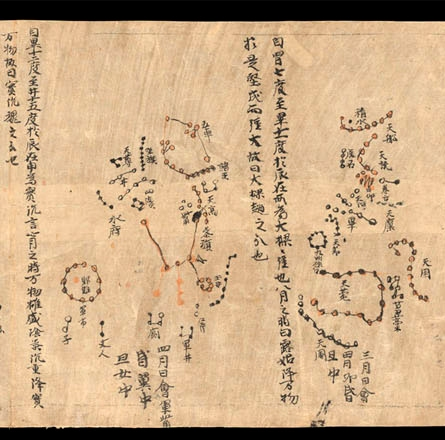
Dunhuang Star Atlas – Orion

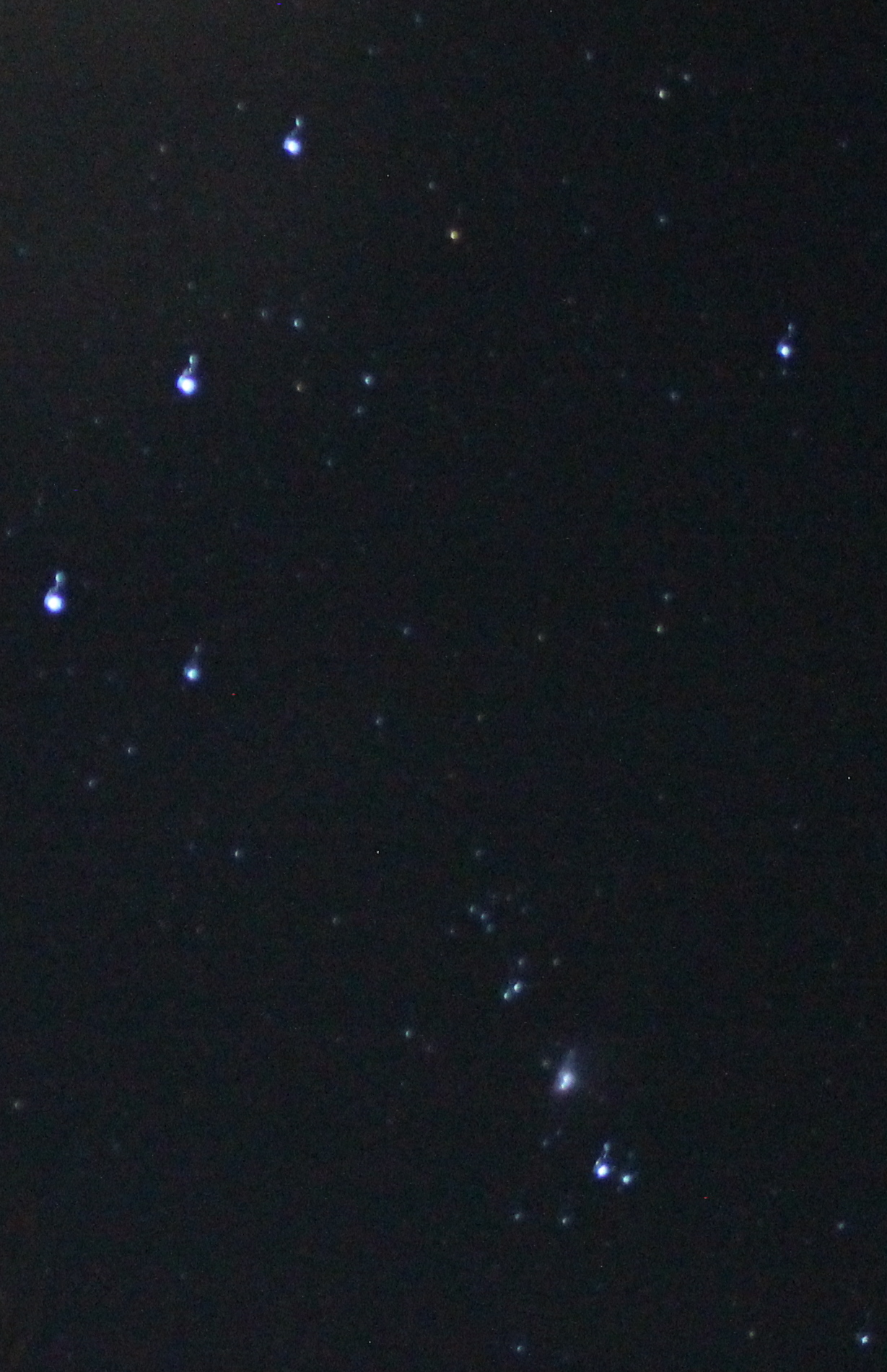
Orion's belt at top left, Orion's sword at bottom right

Richard Hinckley Allen lists many folk names for the Belt of Orion. English ones include: Jacob's Rod or Jacob's Staff; Peter's Staff; the Golden Yard-arm; The L, or Ell; The Ell and Yard; the Yard-stick, and the Yard-wand; the Ellwand; Our Lady's Wand; the Magi / the Three Kings; the Three Marys; or simply the Three Stars.

The passage "Canst thou bind the sweet influences of Pleiades, or loose the bands of Orion?" is found in the Bible's Book of Job, and a reference to Orion is found in the Book of Amos. Tennyson's poem The Princess describes Orion's belt as:

...those three stars of the airy Giant's zone,
That glitter burnished by the frosty dark.

In China's Classic of Poetry, the asterism, under the name "Shen" (参), was paired with Antares, which is known as "Shang" (商), to be a metaphor for two people who could never unite. This might have stemmed from the observation that both Orion's Belt and Antares rise in the east and set in the west, but Antares only rises once Orion's Belt has set and vice versa.

The Malay people refer to the Orion Belt as Bintang Tiga Beradik (literally "three brother stars"). This constellation, when it is near the western horizon, is often used to indicate the direction of the qibla, the Islamic direction of prayer for the people of the Malay Archipelago. Like other stars, the three stars also serve as navigational guides for Malay sailors

The three stars of the belt are known in Portugal and South America as Las Tres Marías in Spanish, and as "As Três Marias" in Portuguese. They also mark the northern night sky when the Sun is at its lowest point, and were a clear marker for ancient timekeeping. In Mexico they are called Los Tres Reyes Magos.

In Finnish mythology, the Belt of Orion is called Väinämöisen vyö (Väinämöinen's Belt). The stars which appear to "hang" off the belt form an asterism called Kalevanmiekka (Kaleva's sword). In pre-Christian Scandinavia, the belt was known as Frigg's Distaff (Friggerock) or Freyja's distaff. Similarly Jacob's Staff and Peter's Staff were European biblical derived terms, as were the Three Magi, or the Three Kings. Väinämöinen's Scythe (Kalevala) and Kalevan Sword are terms from Finnish mythology.

The Seri people of northwestern Mexico call the three belt stars Hapj (a name denoting a hunter) which consists of three stars: Hap (mule deer), Haamoja (pronghorn), and Mojet (bighorn sheep). Hap is in the middle and has been shot by the hunter; its blood has dripped onto Tiburón Island.

The Māori people of New Zealand refer to the belt as Tautoru (literally "string of three"), and it is often seen as the stern of the constellation Te Waka o Rangi (the canoe of Rangi), which extends to its prow at Matariki (The Pleiades). The rising of Matariki in the dawn sky marks the Māori New Year in late May or early June.

The discredited archaeological Orion correlation theory postulated a connection between the positions of the Giza pyramids and those of the belt, with the linkage shown to be spurious when placed within the proper historical context.

== Gallery ==
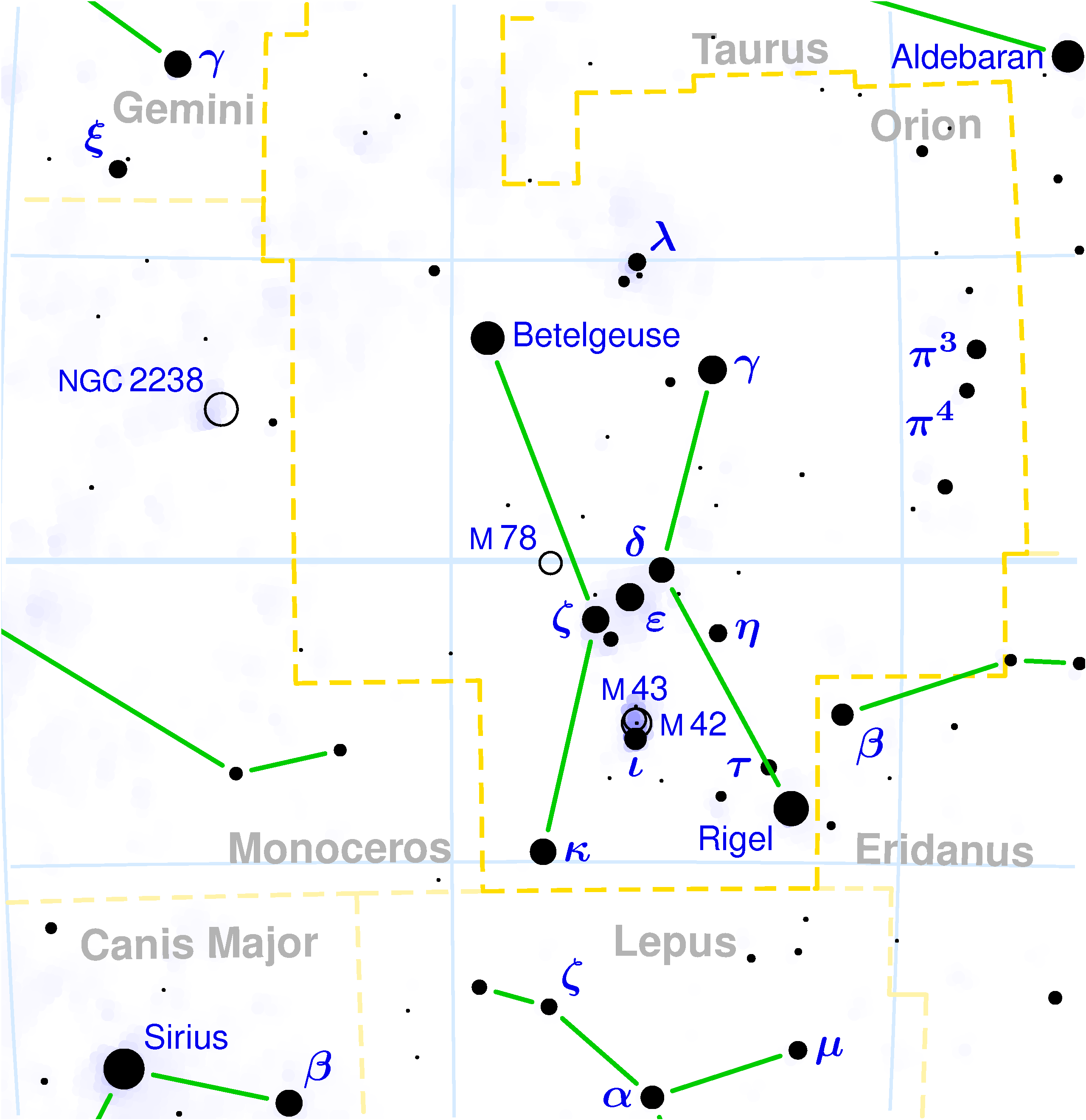
Map of Orion

The region of Alnitak and Alnilam (upper right) and the Flame Nebula

== See also ==
- Thornborough Henges, ancient monument in North Yorkshire
- Orion correlation theory, fringe theory relating the Giza pyramids to the stars of Orion's Belt
- Orion OB1
