= Iota Orionis =

Multiple star system in the constellation Orion

ι Orionis
- Location of ι Ori (circled)

Observation data Epoch J2000 Equinox ICRS
- Constellation: Orion
- ι Orionis A
- Right ascension: 05^{h} 35^{m} 25.98191^{s}
- Declination: −05° 54′ 35.6435″
- Apparent magnitude (V): 2.77
- ι Orionis B
- Right ascension: 05^{h} 35^{m} 26.4562^{s}
- Declination: −05° 54′ 44.4471″
- Apparent magnitude (V): 7.00
- ι Orionis C
- Right ascension: 05^{h} 35^{m} 29.20268^{s}
- Declination: −05° 54′ 47.240″
- Apparent magnitude (V): 9.76

Characteristics

ι Orionis A
- Spectral type: O9 III + B0.8 III/IV + B2:IV:
- U−B color index: −1.08
- B−V color index: −0.24

ι Orionis B
- Spectral type: B8 III
- Variable type: Orion

Astrometry

ι Orionis A
Radial velocity (R_{v})	+32.02+0.30 −0.32 km/s
Proper motion (μ)	RA: +1.42 mas/yr Dec.: −0.46 mas/yr
Parallax (π)	1.40±0.22 mas
Distance	1,340+46 −42 ly (412+14 −13 pc)

ι Orionis B
Proper motion (μ)	RA: +1.42 mas/yr Dec.: −0.46 mas/yr
Parallax (π)	2.787±0.0476 mas
Distance	1,170 ± 20 ly (359 ± 6 pc)

Orbit
Primary	ι Orionis Aa1
Name	ι Orionis Aa2
Period (P)	29.13376 days
Semi-major axis (a)	132.32+1.01 −0.96 R_{☉}
Eccentricity (e)	0.7452+0.0010 −0.0014
Inclination (i)	62.86+0.17 −0.14°
Periastron epoch (T)	2,451,121.658 HJD
Argument of periastron (ω) (primary)	122.15±0.11°

Details

ι Ori Aa1
Mass	23.18+0.57 −0.53 M_{☉}
Radius	9.10+0.12 −0.10 R_{☉}
Luminosity	68,000 L_{☉}
Surface gravity (log g)	3.73 cgs
Temperature	31,000 K
Metallicity [Fe/H]	+0.10 dex
Rotational velocity (v sin i)	122 km/s
Age	4.0–5.5 Myr

ι Ori Aa2
Mass	13.44±0.30 M_{☉}
Radius	4.94+0.16 −0.23 R_{☉}
Luminosity	8,630 L_{☉}
Surface gravity (log g)	3.78 cgs
Temperature	18,319+531 −758 K
Age	9.4±1.5 Myr

ι Ori Ab
Mass	7.77 M_{☉}

ι Ori B
Mass	5.12 M_{☉}
Radius	3.03 R_{☉}
Luminosity	526 L_{☉}
Surface gravity (log g)	4.0 cgs
Temperature	18,000 K
Metallicity [Fe/H]	0.278 dex
Age	~3 Myr

Other designations
- Hatysa, ι Orionis, Na'ir al Saif, BD−06°1241, FK5 209, SAO 132323, ADS 4193, WDS J05354-0555
- ι Ori A: 44 Orionis, HD 37043, HIP 26241, HR 1899, 2MASS J05352597-0554357
- ι Ori B: V2451 Ori, 2MASS J05352645-0554445
- ι Ori C: 2MASS J05352920-0554471

Database references
SIMBAD	ι Ori
- ι Ori B
- ι Ori C

Iota Orionis (ι Orionis, abbreviated ι Ori) is a multiple star system in the equatorial constellation of Orion the hunter. It is the eighth-brightest member of Orion with an apparent visual magnitude of 2.77 and also the brightest member of the asterism known as Orion's Sword. It is a member of the NGC 1980 open cluster. From parallax measurements, it is located at a distance of roughly 1,340 light-years (412 parsecs) from the Sun.

The system has three visible components designated Iota Orionis A, B and C. Iota Orionis A has also been resolved using speckle interferometry and is also a massive spectroscopic binary, with components Iota Orionis Aa1 (officially named Hatysa /hɑːˈtiːsə/), Aa2, and Ab.

== Nomenclature ==
ι Orionis (Latinised to Iota Orionis) is the system's Bayer designation. The designations of the three constituents as Iota Orionis A, B and C, and those of A's components - Iota Orionis Aa1, Aa2, and Ab - derive from the convention used by the Washington Multiplicity Catalog (WMC) for multiple star systems, and adopted by the International Astronomical Union (IAU).

The system has the traditional name Nair al Saif, from the Arabic نير السيف nayyir as-sayf "the Bright One of the Sword", though this is little used. Since Antonín Bečvář's 1951 Atlas Coeli, it has borne the proper name Hatysa. Kunitzsch was unable to find an older source for the latter name.

In 2016, the IAU organized a Working Group on Star Names (WGSN) to catalog and standardize proper names for stars. The WGSN decided to attribute proper names to individual stars rather than entire multiple systems. It approved the name Hatysa for the component Iota Orionis Aa on 5 September 2017 and it is now so included in the List of IAU-approved Star Names.

Iota Orionis B is a variable star and in 2011 it was given the variable star designation V2451 Orionis.

== Distance ==
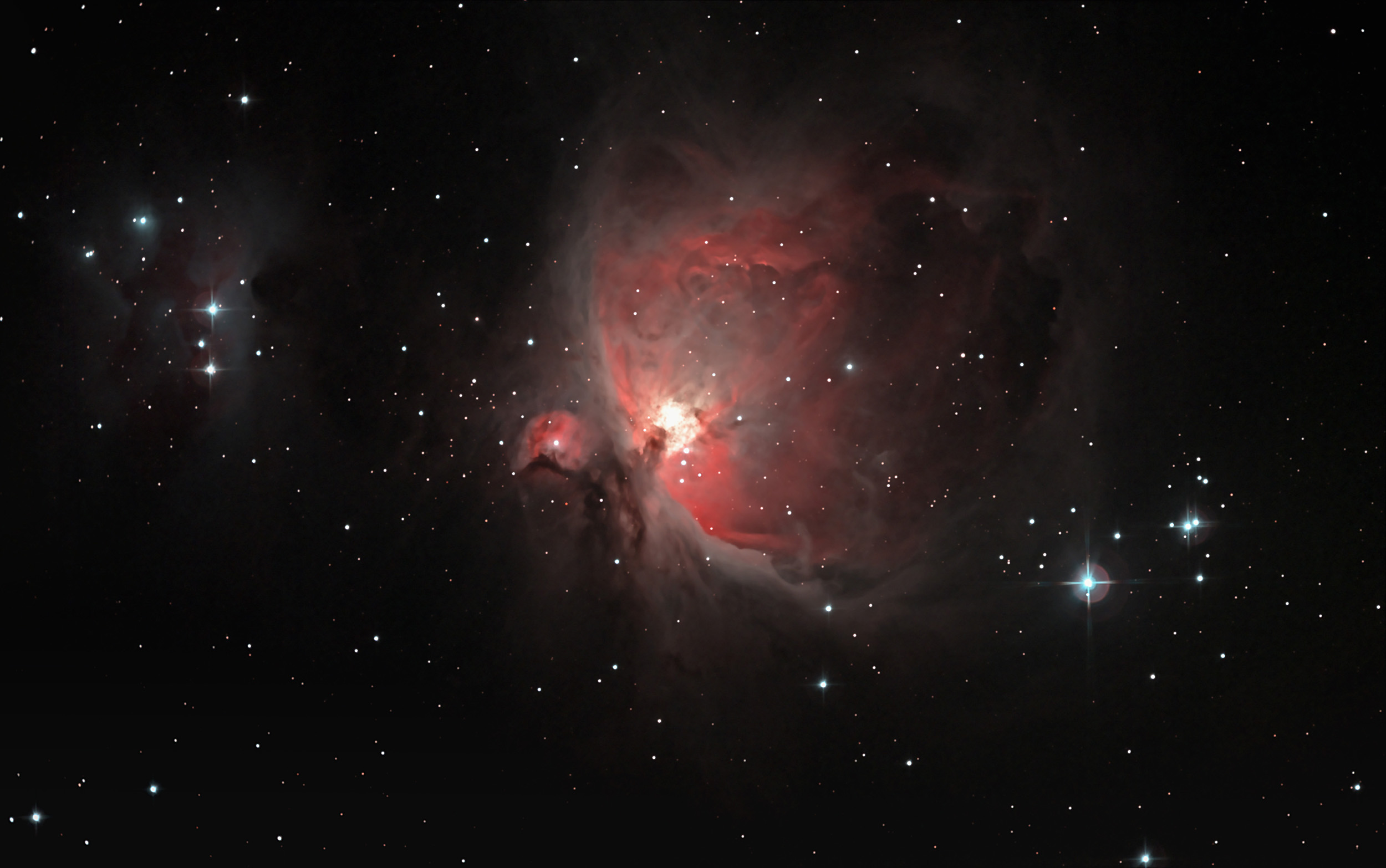
ι Orionis is the bright star to the right (south) of the Orion Nebula

Iota Orionis has a parallax of 1.40±0.22 mas in the Hipparcos new reduction, indicating a distance around 700 pc. The previous published Hipparcos parallax was 2.46±0.77 mas, suggesting a closer distance. Gaia Data Release 3 has individual parallaxes for the two fainter components of the Iota Orionis star system of 2.7870±0.0476 mas and 2.6058±0.0242 mas, indicating distances of 359 pc and 384 pc respectively, with margins of error of just a few parsecs. There is little doubt that all three stars are at the same distance.

Iota Orionis is generally assumed to be associated with the open cluster NGC 1980, which is at a distance of around 400 pc. However, they may not lie at exactly the same distance and Iota Orionis may have a complex history involving stellar encounters and runaway stars. NGC 1980 contains few bright stars other than Iota Orionis. Only eighteen other stars are considered members in a survey down to 14th magnitude, most of them around 9th magnitude but including the 5th magnitude stars HR 1886 and 1887.

== Properties ==
Iota Orionis is dominated by the multiple star Iota Orionis A. It is clearly identified as a double-lined spectroscopic binary whose components are a stellar class O9 III star (blue giant) and a class B0.8 III/IV star about 2 magnitudes fainter. The combined spectral type has long been accepted as O9 III and it was listed as a standard star for that type. The collision of the stellar winds from this pair makes the system a strong X-ray source. Oddly, the two objects of this system appear to have different ages, with the secondary being about double the age of the primary. In combination with the high eccentricity (e=0.764) of their 29-day orbit, this suggests that the binary system was created through a capture, rather than by being formed together and undergoing a mass transfer. This capture may have occurred, for example, through an encounter between two binary systems, with one star being donated from each binary and two runaway stars being ejected. A third component 155 mas away has been identified using speckle interferometry and is probably a B2 subgiant.

The primary component of Iota Orionis A is a class O giant star with a mass of about 23 M_{☉}. It has a surface temperature of 32,500 K and radius of 8.3 R_{☉}, resulting in a bolometric luminosity of 68,000 L_{☉}. It is calculated to be around nine million years old. The secondary star of the spectroscopic binary pair is a class B giant or subgiant with a mass of about 13 M_{☉}. It has a temperature of 27,000 K and radius of 5.4 R_{☉}, resulting in it radiating over 8,000 times as much energy as the sun.

Iota Orionis B is a B8 giant at 11" (approximately 5,000 AU) which has been shown to be variable, and likely to be a young stellar object. It is also a helium-weak chemically peculiar star. The fainter Iota Orionis C is an A0 star at 49".
