= Theta1 Orionis E =

Star in the constellation Orion

θ^{1} Orionis E
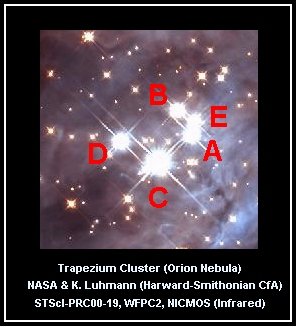
- θ^{1} Orionis E and nearby stars in the Trapezium Cluster

Observation data Epoch J2000 Equinox ICRS
- Constellation: Orion
- Right ascension: 05^{h} 35^{m} 15.773^{s}
- Declination: −05° 23′ 10.02″
- Apparent magnitude (V): 11.40 – 11.81

Characteristics
- Evolutionary stage: Pre-main sequence
- Spectral type: G2 IV
- Variable type: Eclipsing

Astrometry
Radial velocity (R_{v})	+29.7±0.2 km/s
Proper motion (μ)	RA: 1.45±0.03 mas/yr Dec.: 1.02±0.08 mas/yr
Parallax (π)	2.557±0.051 mas
Distance	1,280 ± 30 ly (391 ± 8 pc)
Absolute magnitude (M_{V})	+1.43

Orbit
Period (P)	9.89522(3) days
Semi-major axis (a)	34.22±0.18 R_{☉} (0.1589±0.0008 AU)
Eccentricity (e)	0
Inclination (i)	73.7±0.9°
Periastron epoch (T)	3281.0455(94) HJD
Semi-amplitude (K_{1}) (primary)	83.36±0.29 km/s
Semi-amplitude (K_{2}) (secondary)	84.57±0.29 km/s

Details

A
Mass	2.755±0.043 M_{☉}
Radius	6.26±0.31 R_{☉}
Luminosity	24.8±4.6 L_{☉}
Surface gravity (log g)	3.29±0.04 cgs
Temperature	5,150±200 K
Rotational velocity (v sin i)	30.7±2.1 km/s
Age	≤0.1 Myr

B
Mass	2.720±0.043 M_{☉}
Radius	6.25±0.30 R_{☉}
Luminosity	24.7±4.5 L_{☉}
Surface gravity (log g)	3.28±0.04 cgs
Temperature	5,150±200 K
Rotational velocity (v sin i)	30.7±2.1 km/s
Age	≤0.1 Myr

Other designations
- 41 Ori E, BD−05°1315E, COUP 732, 2MASS J05351577-0523100

Database references
SIMBAD	data

θ^{1} Orionis E (Latinised as Theta^{1} Orionis E) is a double-lined spectroscopic binary located 4' north of θ^{1} Orionis A in the Trapezium Cluster. The two components are almost identical pre-main-sequence stars in a close circular orbit, and they show shallow eclipses that produce brightness variations of a few tenths of a magnitude.

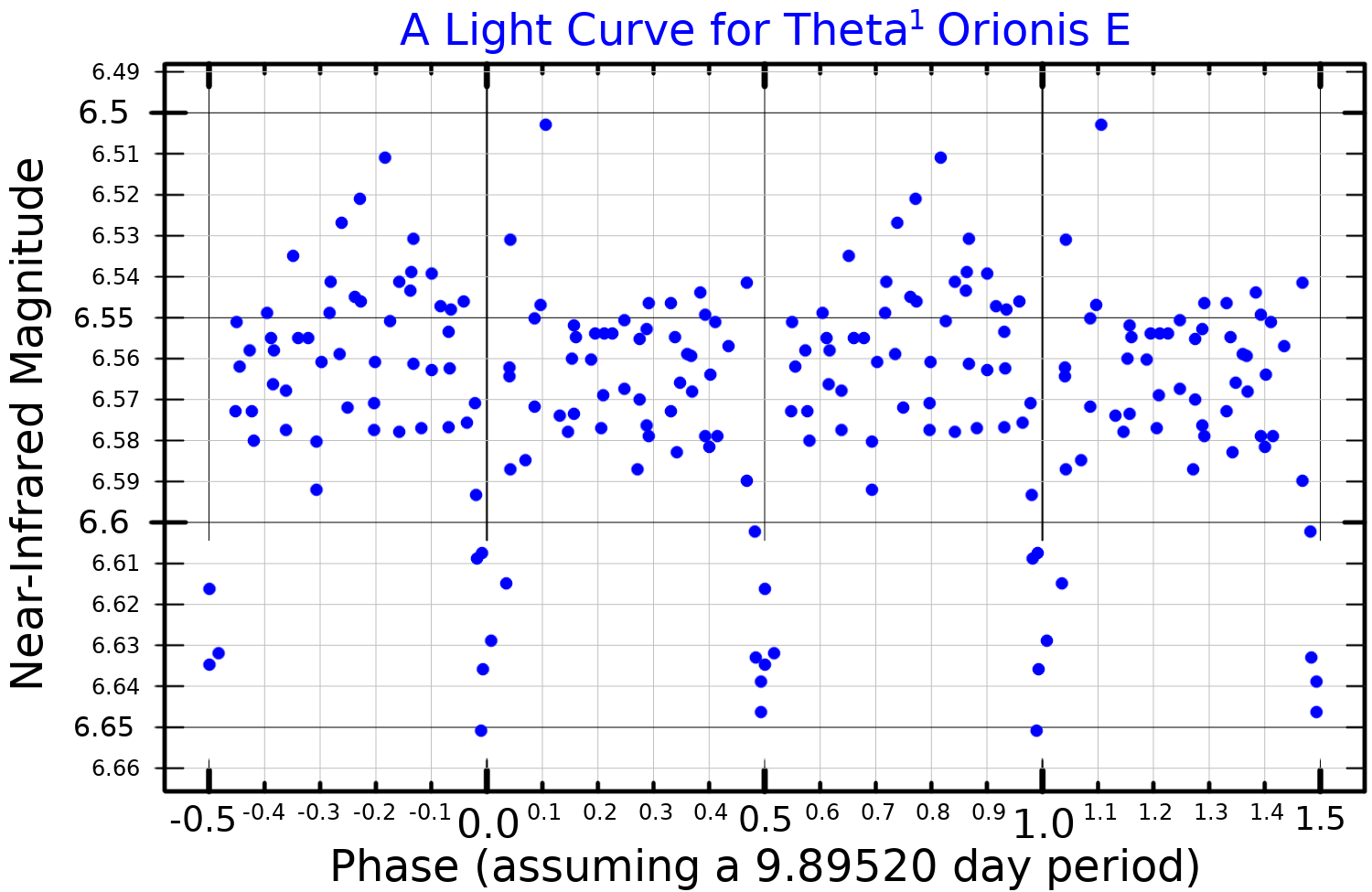
A near-infrared (4.5 micron) light curve for Theta^{1} Orionis E, adapted from Morales-Calderón et al. (2012)

Each component of the binary system is slightly under 3 M_{☉}. Although they have a subgiant spectral classification, they are still contracting onto the main sequence and are estimated to be less than 100,000 years old. It is estimated that they will reach the main sequence as smaller hotter late-B stars.

The variability was first reported in 1954 and confirmed as an eclipsing binary in 2012. It has not been assigned a variable star designation but is listed in the New Catalogue of Suspected Variable Stars.
