= NGC 1980 =

Open cluster in the constellation Orion

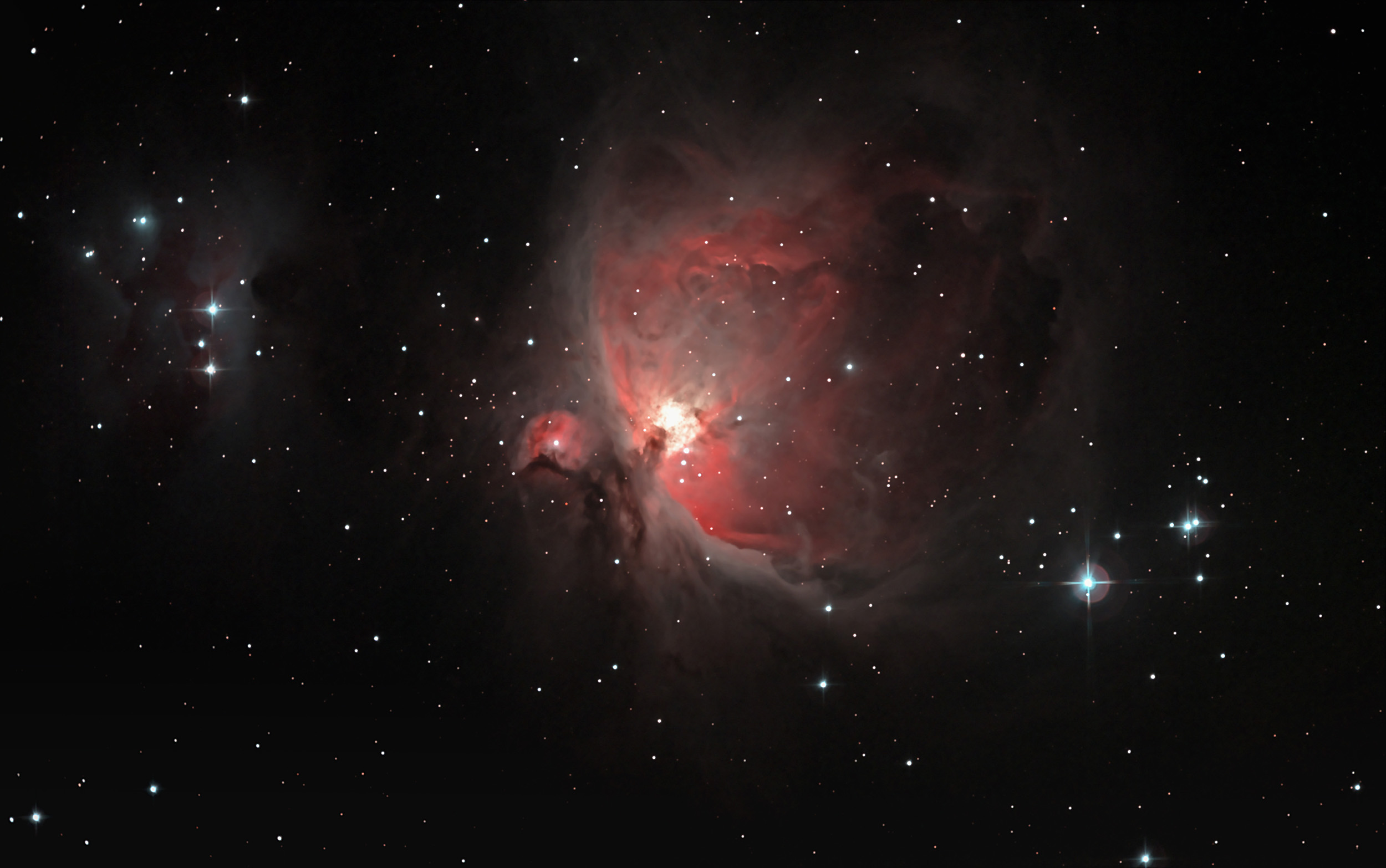
- The Orion Nebula M42 with NGC 1980 on the right (right is south)

Observation data (J2000.0 epoch)
- Right ascension: 05^{h} 25^{m} 26.0^{s}
- Declination: −05° 54′ 36″
- Distance: 1,793 ly (550 pc)
- Apparent magnitude (V): 2.5
- Apparent dimensions (V): 14′ × 14′

Physical characteristics
- Estimated age: 4.7 million
- Other designations: Lower Sword, Collinder 72, OCL 529, WH V 31

Associations
- Constellation: Orion

NGC 1980 is a young open cluster of stars that is associated with an emission nebula in the constellation Orion. Alternatively, it is known as OCL 529, Collinder 72, and The Lost Jewel of Orion It was discovered by German-English astronomer William Herschel on 31 January 1786. Its apparent size is 14 × 14 arc minutes and it is located around the star Iota Orionis on the southern tip of the Orion constellation.

Herschel made his first observation of the cluster which was called WH V 31 on 31 January 1786, but he possibly observed it during his studies of double stars on 20 September 1783.
