= Theta2 Orionis =

Star in the constellation Orion

θ^{2} Orionis
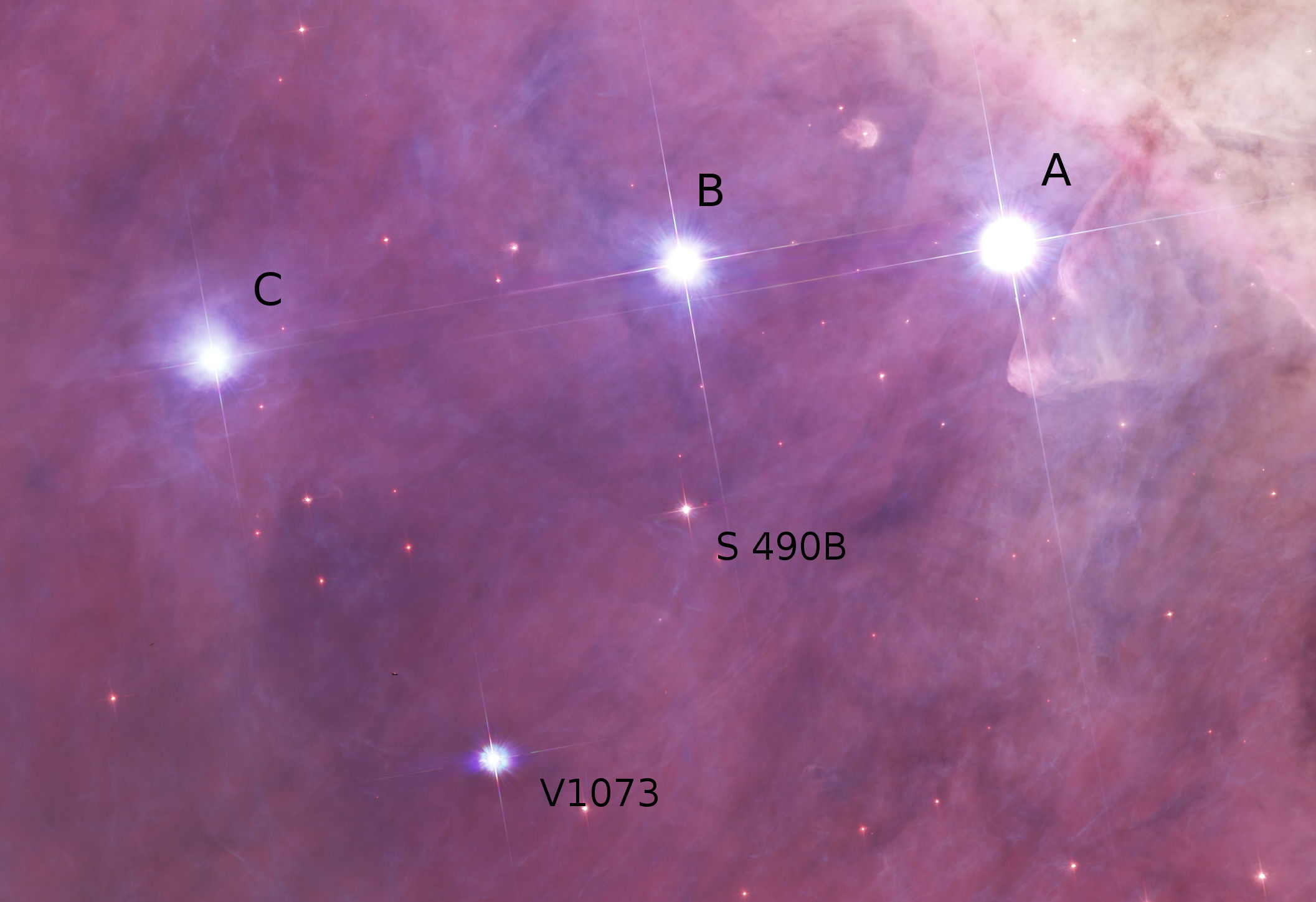
- The three components of θ^{2} Orionis, plus nearby stars Credit: Ian Nartowicz (derived from ESA/Hubble image)

Observation data Epoch J2000 Equinox ICRS
- Constellation: Orion
- A
- Right ascension: 05^{h} 35^{m} 22.90124^{s}
- Declination: −05° 24′ 57.8326″
- Apparent magnitude (V): 5.02
- B
- Right ascension: 05^{h} 35^{m} 26.40075^{s}
- Declination: −05° 25′ 00.7938″
- Apparent magnitude (V): 6.380
- C
- Right ascension: 05^{h} 35^{m} 31.43111^{s}
- Declination: −05° 25′ 16.3717″
- Apparent magnitude (V): 8.18

Characteristics
- Spectral type: O9.5IVp (A_{1}/Aa1); B0.7V (B_{1}); B5V (C_{1})

Astrometry

A
Radial velocity (R_{v})	35.6 km/s
Proper motion (μ)	RA: +2.630 mas/yr Dec.: +2.394 mas/yr
Parallax (π)	2.9728±0.2136 mas
Distance	1,100 ± 80 ly (340 ± 20 pc)
Absolute magnitude (M_{V})	−4.3

B
Proper motion (μ)	RA: +1.161 mas/yr Dec.: +0.162 mas/yr
Parallax (π)	2.3870±0.0499 mas
Distance	1,370 ± 30 ly (419 ± 9 pc)
Absolute magnitude (M_{V})	−2.60

C
Proper motion (μ)	RA: +2.510 mas/yr Dec.: +3.731 mas/yr
Parallax (π)	2.4513±0.0380 mas
Distance	1,330 ± 20 ly (408 ± 6 pc)
Absolute magnitude (M_{V})	−0.6

Details

A_{1} or Aa1
Mass	29 M_{☉}
Radius	8.2 R_{☉}
Luminosity	85,000 L_{☉}
Surface gravity (log g)	4.1 cgs
Temperature	35,000 K
Rotational velocity (v sin i)	133 km/s

A_{2} or Aa2
Mass	12.6 M_{☉}
Rotational velocity (v sin i)	~300 km/s

A_{3} or Ab
Mass	3-7 M_{☉}
Luminosity	30-2,000 L_{☉}

B_{1}
Mass	14.8 M_{☉}
Radius	4.3 R_{☉}
Luminosity	12,300 L_{☉}
Surface gravity (log g)	4.30 cgs
Temperature	29,300 K
Rotational velocity (v sin i)	33 km/s
Age	<2 Myr

B_{2}
Mass	1.6±0.7 M_{☉}

C_{1}
Mass	4±1 M_{☉}
Luminosity	616 L_{☉}
Temperature	13,800 K
Rotational velocity (v sin i)	78 km/s
Age	<1 Myr

C_{3}
Mass	1.7±0.2 M_{☉}

Other designations
- θ^{2} Ori, STF 4016, WDS J05354-0525, ADS 4188
- θ^{2} Ori A: 43 Ori, HR 1897, BD−05°1319, HD 37041, SAO 132321, HIP 26235, CCDM 05353-0524E
- θ^{2} Ori B: BD−05°1320, HD 37042, SAO 132322, CCDM 05353-0524F
- θ^{2} Ori C: V361 Ori, BD−05°1326, HD 37062, SAO 132329, S 490A, CCDM 05353-0524G

Database references
SIMBAD	data
- data2
- data3

Theta^{2} Orionis (θ^{2} Ori) is a multiple star system in the constellation Orion containing eight stars. It is a few arc minutes from its more famous neighbour the Trapezium Cluster, also known as θ^{1} Orionis.

== Components ==
The three stars of θ^{2} Orionis within the Orion Nebula

Visually, θ^{2} Orionis consists of three stars in a line, each about an arc-minute from the next. The brightest of the three, θ^{2} Orionis A, is itself a triple star system, while θ^{2} Orionis B is a binary and θ^{2} Orionis C is a triple, bringing the total number of stars to eight.

In addition to the well-known three stars, the Washington Double Star Catalog confusingly lists a component D which is actually θ^{1} Orionis C. There is one other star brighter than 10th magnitude in the region. V1073 Orionis is a B9.5 Orion variable that forms an equilateral triangle with θ^{2} Ori B and C.

θ^{2} Orionis C has a second entry in the Washington Double Star Catalog under the name S490. The companion is 10th magnitude and actually lies between θ^{2} Ori B and V1073 Ori.

θ^{1} Orionis, the well known Trapezium cluster, is only 2 arc minutes away from θ^{2} Orionis A. Despite the names, θ^{2} Orionis A is marginally brighter than the brightest star in the Trapezium. The Catalog of Components of Double and Multiple Stars includes the stars of θ^{1} and θ^{2} Ori within the same system of 13 components.

There are dozens of much fainter stars in the same field, many of them pre-main-sequence stars still forming from the Orion molecular cloud complex.

== Properties ==
Theta^{2} Orionis A, of apparent magnitude 5.02, is a triple star system. Its spectral lines were seen to change position periodically, indicating orbital motion. The first orbit was derived in 1924, indicating a period of 21 days and a rather eccentric orbit. This companion, named Theta^{2} Orionis A_{2}, was later resolved interferometrically, yielding a secondary-to-primary flux ratio of 0.52±0.04 and a mass estimate of 10±2 solar masses, suggesting an early B spectrum. Aditionally, speckle interferometry has resolved a companion about 0.3" away, around 147 AU, named Theta^{2} Orionis A_{3}. The presence of nearby companions helps to explain the unexpectedly high mass and visual luminosity for an O9.5 star at this distance, if it was assumed to be a single star. The three stars together have nearly the same mass as the O6 star θ^{1} Orionis C and visually are even brighter.

Theta^{2} Orionis A_{1} is an O-type star of spectral type O9.5IVp, 29 times as massive as the Sun and 85,000 times as luminous, with a temperature of 35,000 K. The companion A_{2} has an estimated mass of 12.6 times solar, while A_{3} is estimated to be between three and seven times as massive as the Sun. The system shows unexplained rapidly variable X-ray emission. The X-rays are not thought to be caused by colliding winds or coronal emissions from the unseen companion, although bright x-ray flares have been observed in some young T Tauri stars.

Theta^{2} Orionis B, of magnitude 6.38, is a binary star whose its components have been observed only once, using interferometry and at a projected separation of 40±1 au. The primary component, B_{1}, is an early B main sequence star nearly 30,000 K and over 10,000 times the luminosity of the Sun. The companion, B_{2}, has a mass of approximately 1.6±0.7 M_{☉} and is thought to be an A or F-type star.

Theta^{2} Orionis C, of apparent magnitude 8.18, is a triple star system consisting of an inner spectroscopic binary, with an orbital period of roughly 13 days and a semi-major axis of 0.165±0.007 au, and an outer companion resolved with interferometry at a projected separation of 15.7±0.2 au. The primary, Theta^{2} Orionis C_{1}, has an estimated mass 4±1 times that of the Sun and is 600 times as luminous, with a temperature of 13,800 K. The spectroscopic secondary, C_{2}, has no known properties. The tertiary, C_{3}, is an A-type star with 1.7 times the mass of the Sun.
