= Trapezium Cluster =

Open cluster in the Orion Nebula in the constellation Orion

Trapezium
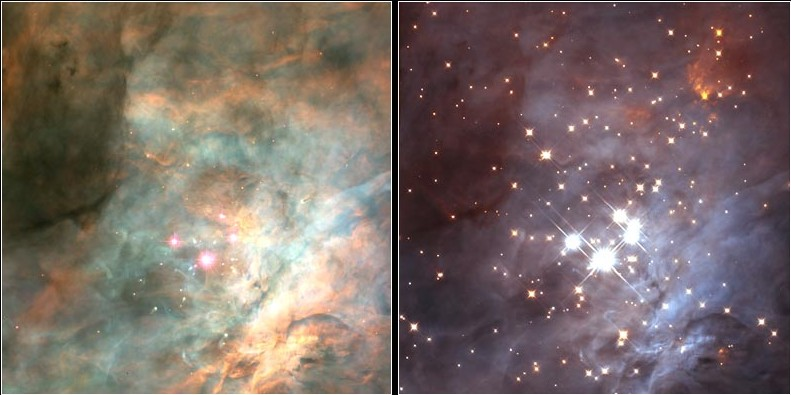
- Trapezium in optical (left) and infrared light (right) from Hubble. NASA photo

Observation data (J2000 epoch)
- Right ascension: 05^{h} 35.4^{m}
- Declination: −05° 27′
- Distance: 1,344±20 ly (412 pc)
- Apparent magnitude (V): 4.0
- Apparent dimensions (V): 47 (seconds of arc)

Physical characteristics
- Radius: 10 ly
- Estimated age: 300,000 years

Associations
- Constellation: Orion

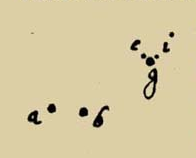
Three of the main stars of the Trapezium, with the triple star in the top right, as sketched by Galileo. The letters do not correspond to the current designations.

The Trapezium or Orion Trapezium Cluster, also known by its Bayer designation of Theta^{1} Orionis (θ^{1} Orionis), is a tight open cluster of stars in the heart of the Orion Nebula, in the constellation of Orion. It was discovered by Galileo Galilei. On 4 February 1617 he sketched three of the stars (A, C and D), but missed the surrounding nebulosity. A fourth component (B) was identified by several observers in 1673, and several more components were discovered later like E, for a total of eight by 1888. Subsequently, several of the stars were determined to be binaries. Telescopes of amateur astronomers from about 5-inch (130 mm) aperture can resolve six stars under good seeing conditions.

The Trapezium is a relatively young cluster that has formed directly out of the parent nebula. The five brightest stars are on the order of 15 to 30 solar masses in size. They are within a diameter of 1.5 light-years of each other and are responsible for much of the illumination of the surrounding nebula. The Trapezium may be a sub-component of the larger Orion Nebula Cluster, a grouping of about 2,000 stars within a diameter of 20 light-years.

== Identification ==
The Trapezium is most readily identifiable by the asterism of four relatively bright stars for which it is named. The four are often identified as A, B, C and D in order of increasing right ascension. The brightest of the four stars is C, or Theta^{1} Orionis C, with an apparent magnitude of 5.13. Both A and B have been identified as eclipsing binaries.

Infrared images of the Trapezium are better able to penetrate the surrounding clouds of dust, and have located many more stellar components. About half the stars within the cluster exhibit circumstellar disks that are dwindling, a likely precursor to planetary formation. In addition, brown dwarfs and low-mass runaway stars have been identified.

== Possible black hole ==
A 2012 paper suggests an intermediate-mass black hole with a mass more than 100 times that of the Sun may be present within the Trapezium, something that could explain the large velocity dispersion of the stars of the cluster.

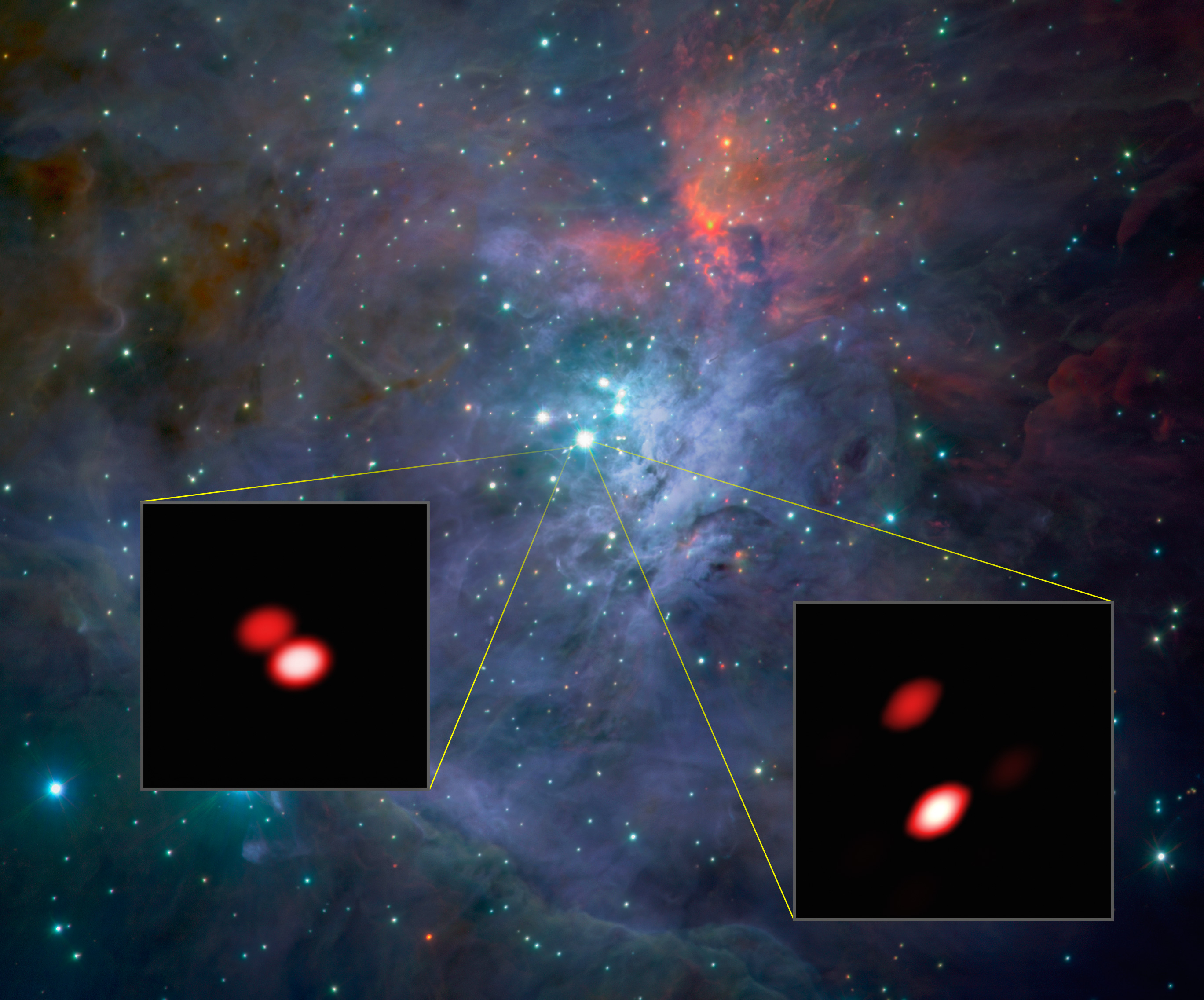
One of the components of the cluster (Theta^{1} Orionis F, lower left) is a double star.

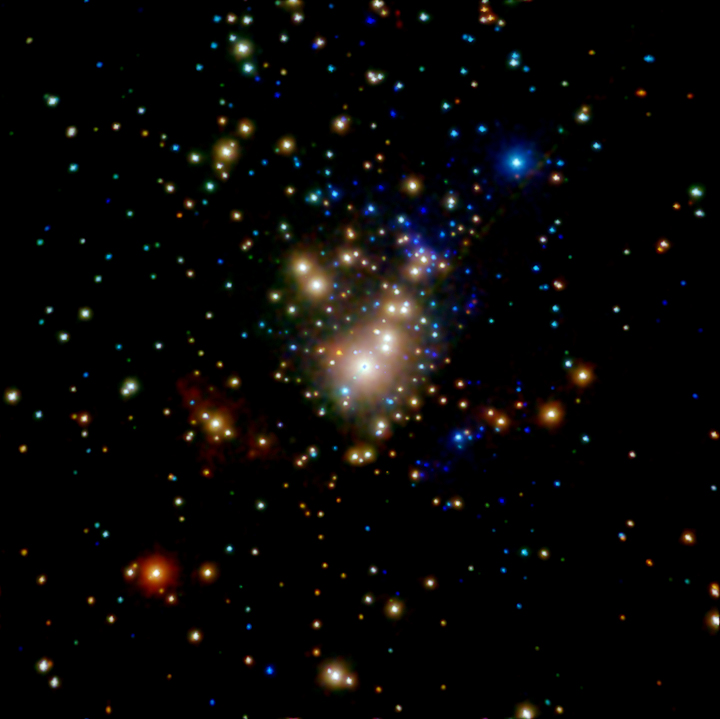
The Chandra X-ray Observatory view of the Orion Nebula

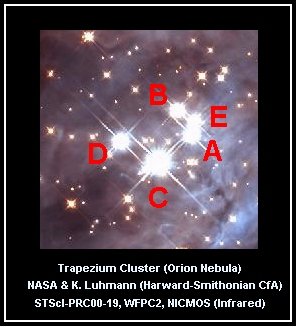
Trapezium star identification

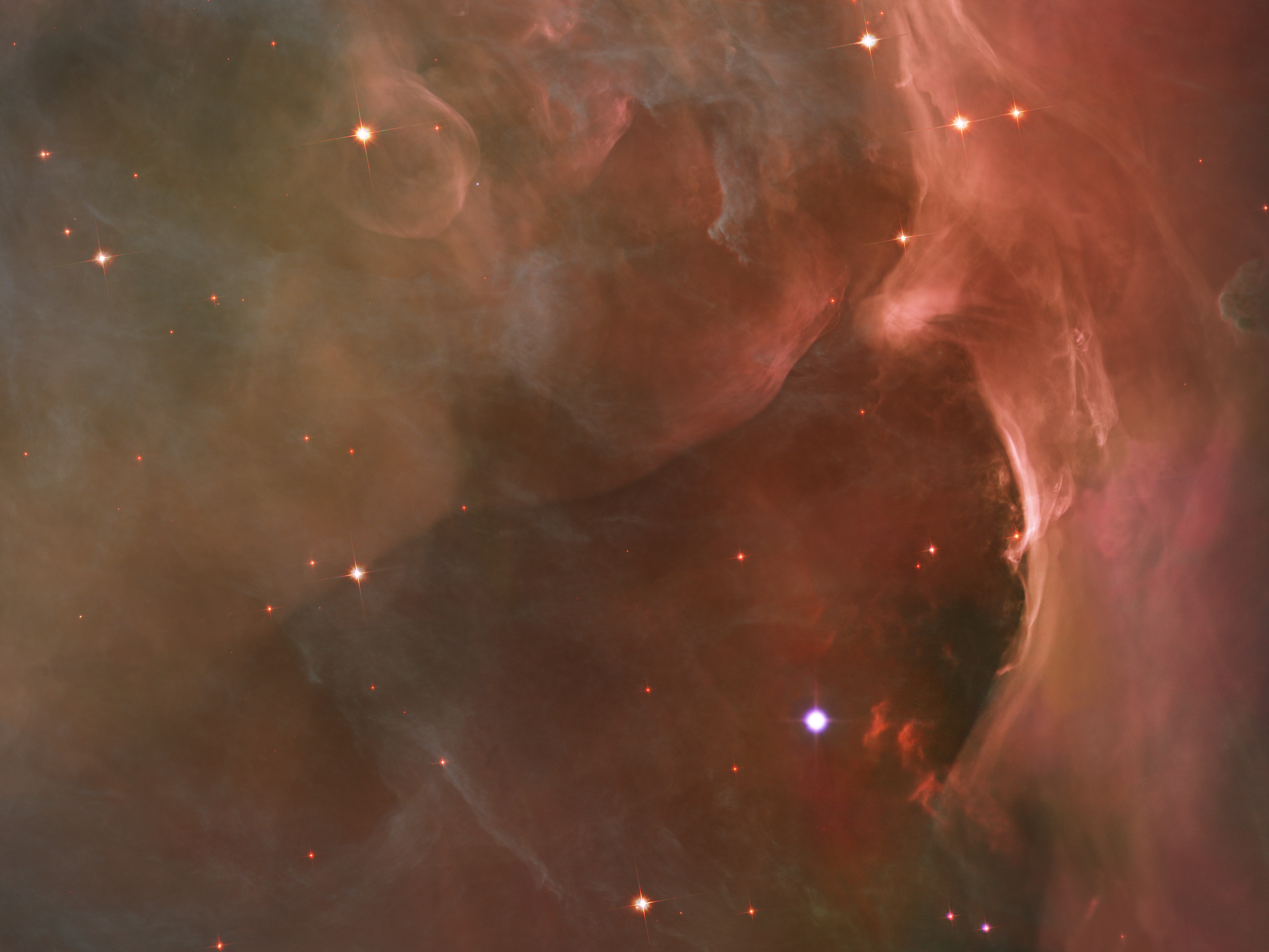
Hubble detail of a region west of the Trapezium, showing arcs and bubbles formed when stellar winds collide with existing interstellar material

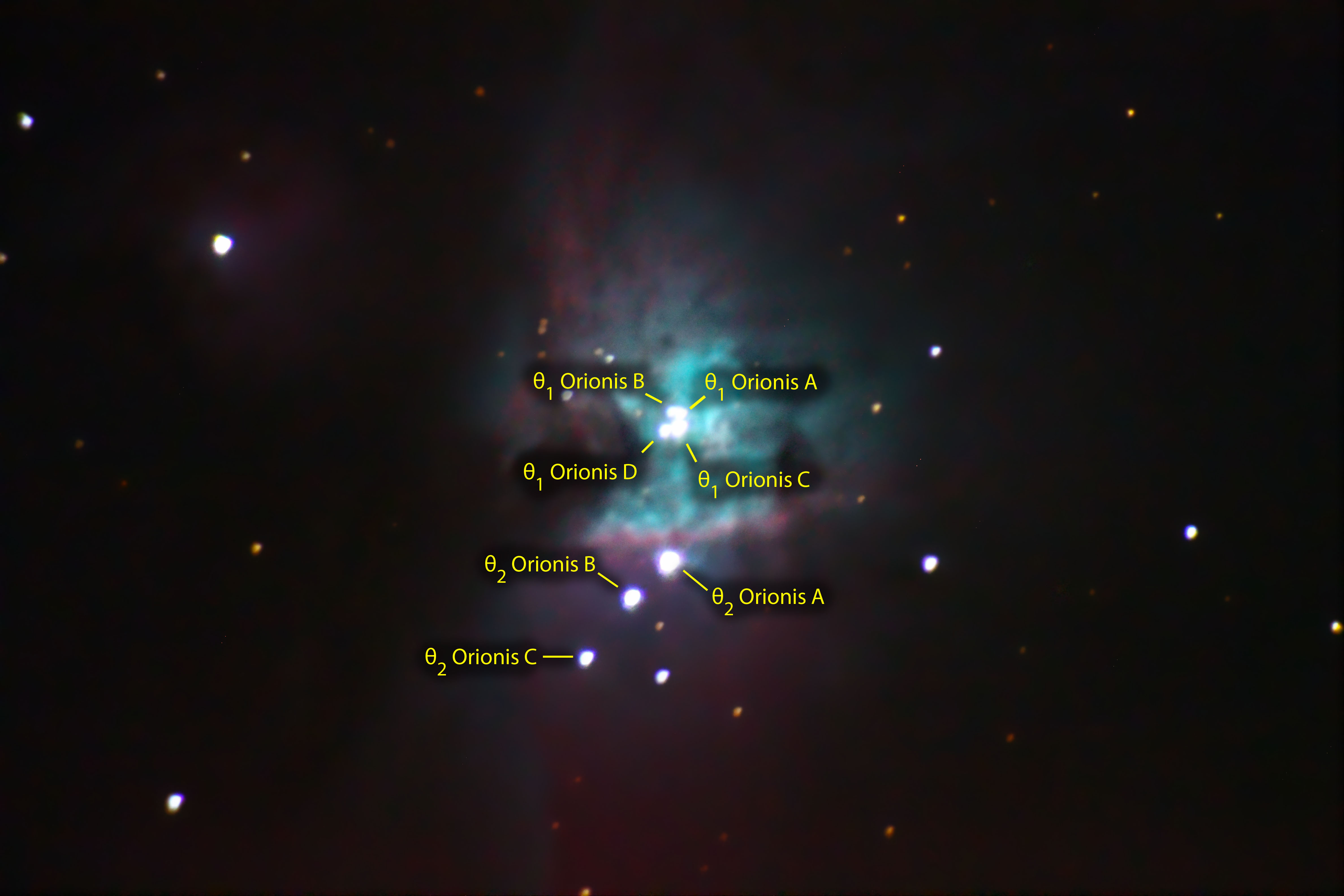
A wider shot of the core details showing the trapezium in context of the surrounding nebulae

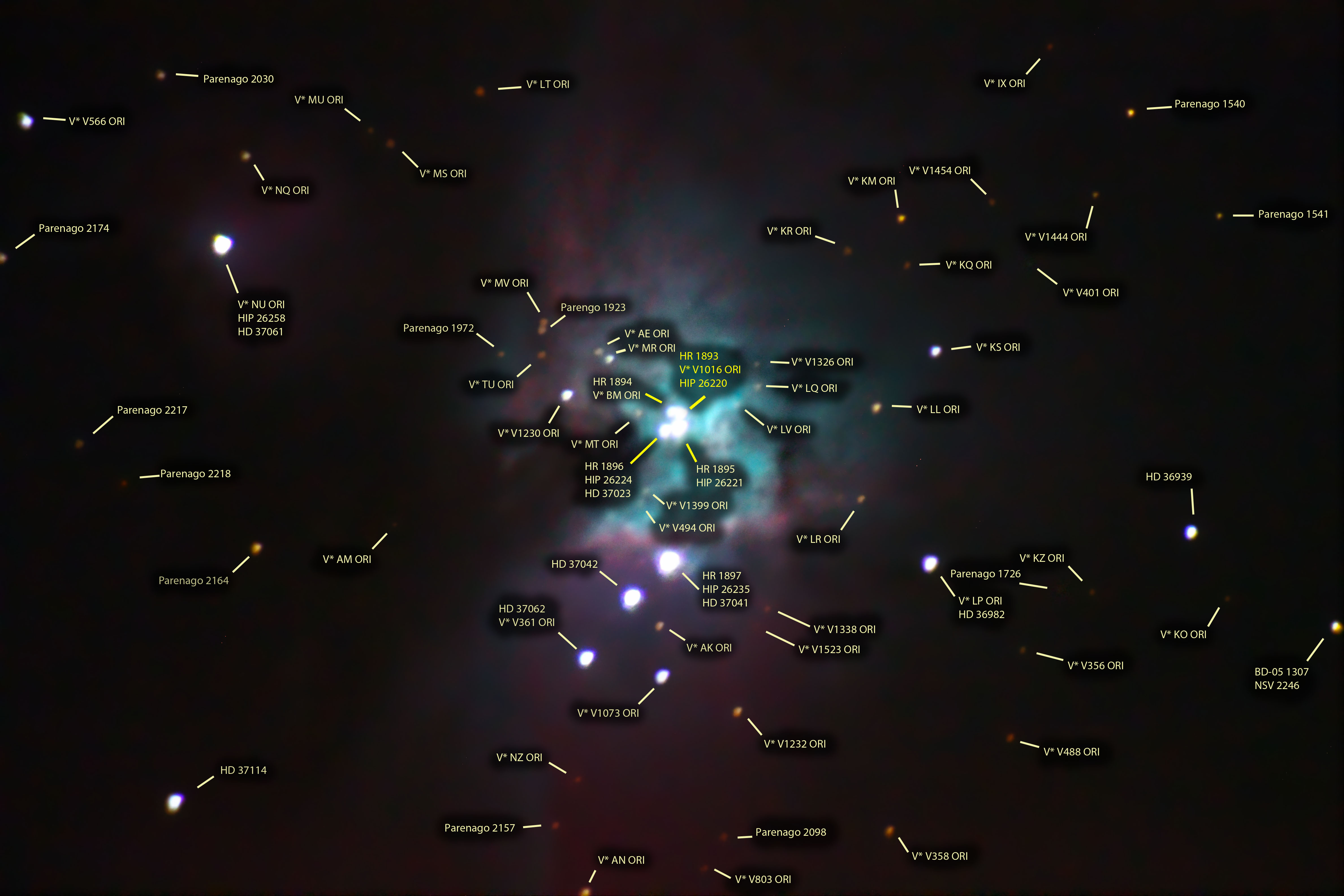
Core detail of the nebula with all the stars identified

== List of objects ==
Star	Spectral class	Stellar components	Designations	Notes
A	B0.5V	3	41 Orionis A, HD 37020, V1016 Orionis	Algol variable
B West	X-ray source	N/A	COUP 766, MAX 97	
B	B1V	5	41 Orionis B, HD 37021, BM Orionis	Algol variable
B East	X-ray source	N/A	COUP 778, MAX 101	
C	O6Vp + B0V	2	41 Orionis C, HD 37022	suspected variable, most massive
D	B1.5Vp	2	41 Orionis D, HD 37023	suspected variable
E	G2IV	2	41 Orionis E, COUP 732	Algol variable + T Tauri star
F	B7.5p	2		
G	K8.5	1	LV 2, COUP 826	has a protoplanetary disk, associated with HH 726
H	K5.5 + K6.5	2	WDS J05353-0523H	
I		1		
