= Theta1 Orionis C =

Multiple star in the constellation Orion

Theta^{1} Orionis C
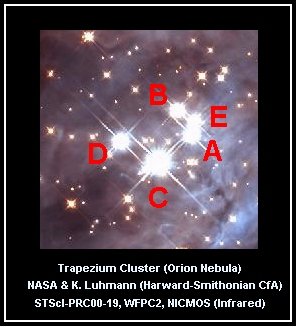
- Theta^{1} Orionis C and companions in the Trapezium cluster

Observation data Epoch J2000 Equinox ICRS
- Constellation: Orion
- Right ascension: 05^{h} 35^{m} 16.46375^{s}
- Declination: −05° 23′ 22.8486″
- Apparent magnitude (V): 5.13

Characteristics
- Spectral type: θ^{1} Orionis C_{1}: O6Vp θ^{1} Orionis C_{2}: B0V
- U−B color index: −0.95
- B−V color index: +0.02
- Variable type: suspected

Astrometry
| Radial velocity (R_{v}) | +30.2±0.6 km/s |
| Proper motion (μ) | RA: −4.13 mas/yr Dec.: +6.82 mas/yr |
| Parallax (π) | 2.11±0.41 mas |
| Distance | 1,337 ± 65 ly (410±20 pc) |
| Absolute magnitude (M_{V}) | −4.9 |

Orbit
| Primary | C_{1} |
| Secondary | C_{2} |
| Period (P) | 11.4±0.2 yr |
| Semi-major axis (a) | (45±2)×10^{−3}" (18.2±0.3 au) |
| Eccentricity (e) | 0.59±0.04 |
| Inclination (i) | 98.6±0.6° |
| Longitude of the node (Ω) | 27.9±0.7° |
| Periastron epoch (T) | 2002.2±0.2 |
| Argument of periastron (ω) (secondary) | 283±2° |
| Semi-amplitude (K_{1}) (primary) | 14.7±2.0 km/s |
| Semi-amplitude (K_{2}) (secondary) | 42.3±3.0 km/s |

Details

C_{1}
| Mass | 33.5±5.2 M_{☉} |
| Radius | 8.91±0.50 R_{☉} |
| Luminosity | 162,000+42,000 −33,000 L_{☉} |
| Surface gravity (log g) | 4.06±0.10 cgs |
| Temperature | 39,000±1,000 K |
| Rotational velocity (v sin i) | 25±10 km/s |
| Age | 2.5±0.5 Myr |

C_{2}
| Mass | 12±3 M_{☉} |
| Radius | 8.24±0.50 R_{☉} |
| Luminosity | 50,000+21,000 −15,000 L_{☉} |
| Surface gravity (log g) | 3.64±0.10 cgs |
| Temperature | 30,000±1,000 K |
| Rotational velocity (v sin i) | 95±10 km/s |
| Age | 2.5±0.5 Myr |

Other designations
- 41 Ori C, HR 1895, HD 37022, SAO 132314, HIP 26221, BD–05°1315C

Database references
| SIMBAD | data |

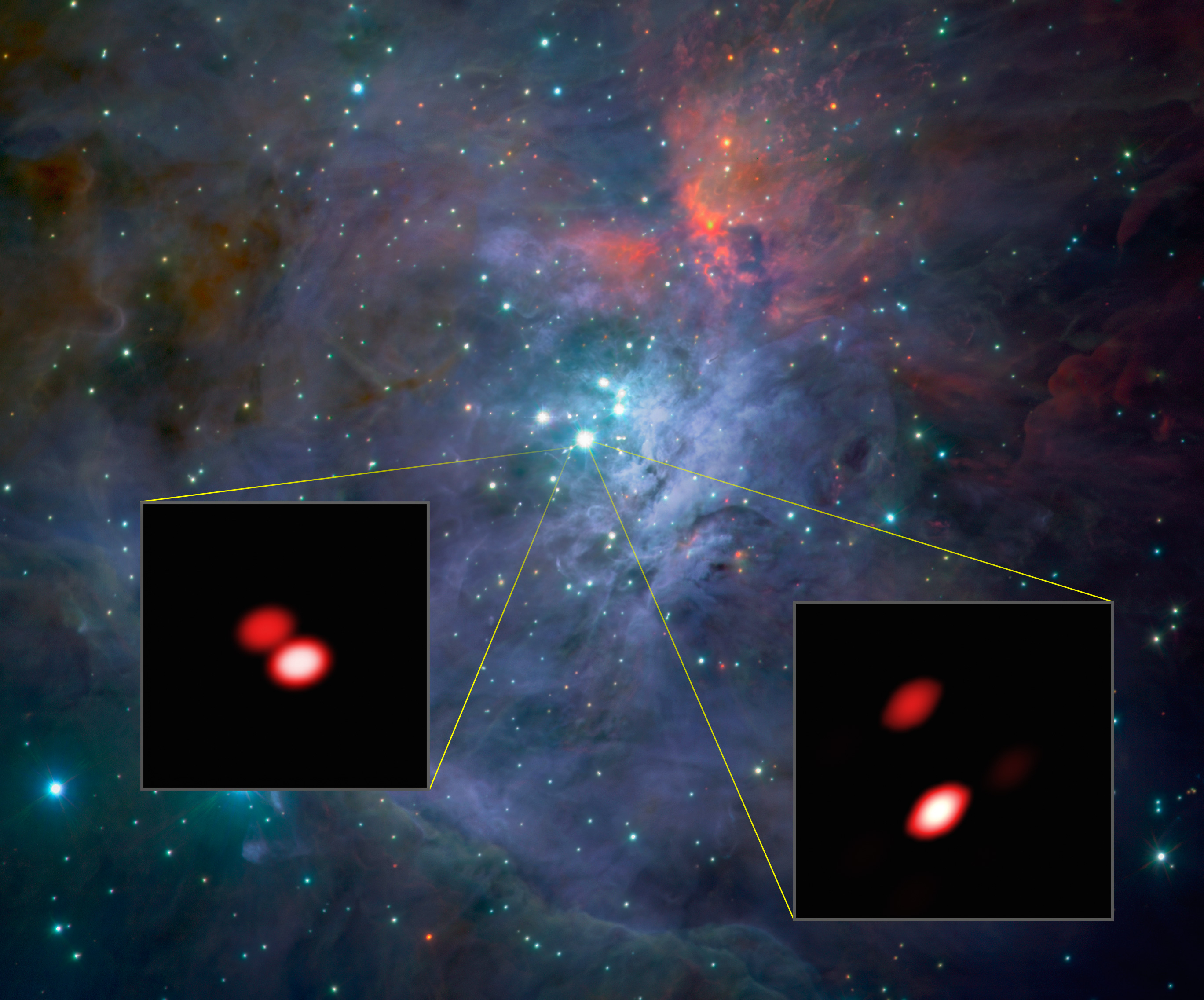
θ^{1} Orionis C is seen as a double star (right inset) with VLTI near-infrared interferometry

Theta^{1} Orionis C (θ^{1} Orionis C) is a member of the Trapezium open cluster that lies within the Orion Nebula. The star C is the most massive of the four bright stars at the heart of the cluster. It is an O class blue main sequence star with a B-type main sequence companion. Its high luminosity and large distance (about 1,500 light years) give it an apparent visible magnitude of 5.1.

Theta^{1} Orionis consists of multiple components, primarily the four stars of the Trapezium cluster, all within one arc-minute of each other. Theta^{2} Orionis is a more distant grouping of three main stars plus several fainter companions, 1-2 arc-minutes from Theta^{1}. Theta^{1} C is itself a binary of two massive stars, C_{1} and C_{2}, orbiting each other every 11.4 years.

Theta^{1} Orionis C_{1} is responsible for generating most of the ultraviolet light that is slowly ionizing (and perhaps photoevaporating) the Orion Nebula. This UV light is also the primary cause of the glow that illuminates the Orion Nebula. The star emits a powerful stellar wind that is a hundred thousand times stronger than the Sun's, and the outpouring gas moves at 1,000 km/s.

The primary has a strong dipolar magnetic field with an intensity of 1.1±0.1 kG. The field is inclined at an angle of 42°±6° to the rotation axis. Detected in 2002, this was the first O-type star found to have a magnetic field, and is most likely a fossil field. This field is confining the motion of the strong stellar wind, which should reduce the mass loss rate by 80%.
