= Timelapse of the Future =

2019 short film by John Boswell

Timelapse of the Future: A Journey to the End of Time
- The YouTube thumbnail
- Directed by: John Boswell
- Written by: John Boswell
- Produced by: John Boswell
- Narrated by: David Attenborough; Craig Childs; Brian Cox; Neil DeGrasse Tyson; Michelle Thaller; Lawrence Krauss; Michio Kaku; Mike Rowe; Phil Plait; Janna Levin; Stephen Hawking; Sean M. Carroll; Alex Filippenko; Martin Rees; Andrey Lysenko (in Russian version)
- Edited by: John Boswell
- Music by: John Boswell
- Animation by: John Boswell (several)
- Layouts by: John Boswell
- Backgrounds by: John Boswell
- Production company: Amber Mountain Studios
- Distributed by: Amber Mountain Studios
- Release date: March 20, 2019
- Running time: 29 minutes 21 seconds
- Country: United States
- Language: English
- Box office: est. US$29,300–314,000 (Note: An auto-calculated estimation based on the number of page views according to Social Blade, as of January 31, 2022.)

Timelapse of the Future: A Journey to the End of Time is a 2019 short epic documentary film created by American astronomy-themed musician and filmmaker John D. Boswell, made as a follow-up to his other short film Timelapse of the Entire Universe. Running at 29 minutes, it is a flowmotion—a combination of a hyper-lapse, time-lapse, and regular shots—of the universe from 2019 to the end of time, with the lapse rate doubling every five seconds. The film consists of self-made and fair use footage from films, the Internet, and speeches by scientists, using current knowledge and combining different hypotheses.

Boswell spent six months on production, beginning in mid-2018, with several months of research prior. It was initially conceived as an art installation without dialogue, but later changed due to the weight of the subject matter. The film's soundtrack combines original music with stock audio; the former was later released in an album titled The Arrow of Time.

Timelapse of the Future was released on Boswell's YouTube channel melodysheep and screened on several venues; it also won the 2020 Webby Awards. The film became viral, garnering millions of views and received positive reviews for its audiovisual craft, though some of the plot points were noted as mere speculations. The film inspired a song and music video by Noah Cyrus.

== Plot ==
The film opens and closes with a quote by Helen Keller: "Everything has its wonders, even darkness and silence. And I learn, whatever state I may be in, therein to be content."

The Anthropocene era begins. Following natural events, humans land on Mars, and Earth's magnetic field flips. Comet Hale-Bopp returns in the year 4385, followed by extreme sea-level rise, an asteroid impact, and Antares going supernova. The Sahara becomes tropical in the 15th millennium, constellations begin to wander, Voyager 1 passes Gliese 445 in the 39th millennium, and the Interglacial Period ends. The Yellowstone supervolcano erupts within 100,000 years, followed by the Apollo 11 footprints fading within a million years, Betelgeuse going supernova, and stone monuments eroding. Next, a gamma-ray burst occurs, Phobos becomes a ring system, and Saturn's rings disappear. Antarctica melts within 50 million years, followed by a significant asteroid impact by the year 70 million (7 × 10^{7}), and the formation of a supercontinent by the year 150 million (1.5 × 10^{8}). The Sun's luminosity increases 300 million years later, causing plants to die 400 million more years down the line, followed by life as a whole in the year 3 billion (3 × 10^{9}) as oceans evaporate. The Sun then expands and becomes a red giant — destroying Earth in the process — before dying as a white dwarf in the year 7.65 billion. Other stars then slowly die, making the universe end in a whimper. The last red dwarfs die in the year 100 trillion (10^{14}).

With stars having completely run out of fuel, the Degenerate Era begins. The universe contains pulsars, black holes, and brown dwarfs, barely lit up by white dwarfs. Over time, gravity ejects most cosmic remnants into the freezing interstellar space. Notably, neutron stars may collide and make superluminous supernovae. Extraterrestrial life might live around aging white dwarfs, which someday die and become black dwarfs. At some point, the supermassive black hole at the center of each galaxy will suck up all degenerate matter that fails to escape it, a similar process to the fate of the Sun.

Theories predict that civilizations could utilize black holes as a source of power and slow down their time to survive the end of the universe. However, if protons are unstable, they begin to decay, and atoms disintegrate, erasing all the remaining degenerate matter in the universe.

With protons having completely decayed, the Black Hole Era begins. The universe contains "zombie galaxies" of black holes and light particles lounging around. Finally, binary black holes might come to life, releasing massive amounts of energy as gravitational waves when merging. In the year 159 novemdecillion (159 × 10^{60}), Hawking radiation finally makes the first black holes die. As they explode, they light back interstellar darkness. The universe then expands further by dark energy, which, if it persists at that time as it is now, will cause the universe to expand forever, making it colder, darker, and emptier.

Theories predict that civilizations, including humans, could create virtual or real-life universes of their own, looking at the possibility of a multiverse and evolution between universes. However, if escaping the universe is impossible, entropy will destroy the remaining black holes. The last black hole evaporates in the year 15 untrigintillion (15 × 10^{96}), making the universe become "nothing but a sea of photons gradually tending towards the same temperature as the expansion of the universe cools them towards absolute zero" according to Brian Cox. During this time, everything in the universe decays to nothing, making the universe end in the year one googol (10^{100}). When this happens, time no longer has any value (it "becomes meaningless").

The scene at the very end of the film, featuring the last black hole (singularity pictured) finally exploding and dying, emitting light in the universe one last time. Invisible light particles are simplified as stripes, similar in appearance to sperm. Red stripes represent heat.

After the short credits, a text appears that says "For Ash," the name of Boswell's son, who was born on January 1, 2019.

== Production ==
=== Film ===
Production of the film started in mid-2018. On October 9, 2018, Boswell posted on his Twitter account an image of an early experiment of the film: a picture of an animated black hole. The screenshot differs from the final result absolutely: extremely huge year numbers were expressed with powers, there was no moving counter, and text was placed directly on the frame instead of on the lower hard matte. Not much has been stated about the production of the film, other than that "Creating it required months of research into physical cosmology, where speculations about the ultimate fate of the universe are legion, and often contradictory." Boswell stated that he was inspired, "years ago," by the idea of the Sun nearing its death in five billion years, asking:

What happens after that? What happens not in 5 billion years, but 5 trillion? The answers are out there, but they are piecemeal and not strung together in a compelling way. So I took the opportunity to create something unique that highlights our collective predictions about the future, both short-term and long-term.

Writing the concept first involved research and then constructing the timeline, which is "the scaffolding around which the visuals and music would be built." After writing, he then broke down the timeline to several, appropriate sequences.

Via the Long Now Foundation, he further explained:

My original plan was to make something more like an art installation piece where there wouldn't be so much talking and facts; it would basically just be the timeline and some chill music and meditative imagery of black holes that would just span for like 10 minutes at a time, and you'd get this abstract impression of how long the future is going to be, and how much emptiness there is. But the more I dug into it, the more I found there's so much to talk about, and so much to say, that it would be foolish to waste this opportunity. I had a draft of this [in summer 2018], and felt it needed to be taken to the next level. So I spent another six months really digging into the VFX of it all, and the research, and figuring out how to build the flow of it and the structure and how to make it work. And I am glad I did. There's just so much to say, and so much I had to leave out. But it came together really well and I am pretty stoked about how it turned out.

Like his other films, animating and editing uses Cinema 4D, Octane Render, and Adobe After Effects. Closed captioning is made by volunteers from Amara and YouTube.

Boswell, like several of his films, was supported by computer scientist Juan Benet, thus having his company Protocol Labs, an open-source R&D lab, credited.

He also clarified that the film is in no way entirely and meant to be scientifically accurate, and that "It's guaranteed you're going to have to do a lot of speculation anyway, so I'm not too concerned about scientific accuracy when it's impossible to predict the future." In the film, he also disclosed, "We may not know [the future] for certain."

=== Sound and music ===
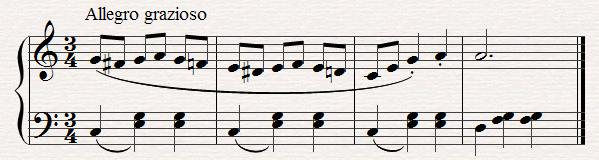
A Waltz section by Johann Strauss. Boswell cited Strauss on "Hawking's Waltz"; he nearly decided to just license his music, but then decided to do it by himself.

Boswell stated to have used several stock audio on Spitfire Audio, Komplete, 8dio, and Omnisphere as well rather than solely original soundtrack composed using Ableton Live; synths played using the Yamaha CS-80 and Moog Sub 37. Piano tunes were played by a Gulbransen upright, an instrument he repeatedly uses. He considers the album/LP, The Arrow of Time, to be his album with "unique sonic and musical challenges." He stated that the idea behind the theme is to "feel huge, open, at times lonely and eerie — in short, to reflect the future of the universe itself," and that he "also wanted to convey some sense of melancholy, as this story foretells the fate of our species in a pretty somber way." The soundtrack's first track, "Sun Mother," uses a 120 beats per minute rhythm, increasing as the time evolves to "highlight the accelerating rate of [the time-lapse]." The music's timing is also taken into consideration, saying that "It was important to me to have moments where the music, visuals, and sound effects could breathe, and the viewer could take in what they have seen."

The line between sound design and music is blurred throughout the experience. From the onset, the [year] counter [in the video] acts as a metronome driving the first piece of music. In many places, the deep rumbles of black holes take the place of synth bass lines, creating a symbiotic bond between the music and the visuals. I often didn't distinguish between whether I was sound designing or composing; it all came from the same place — the need to create a mood, a sense of being present at an alien time and place. [...] The intensity and variety of the events, the interplay with the music all combined made it difficult to not get muddied into a sonic mess. It took very careful tweaking and sound selection to make it work[,] I recall spending a couple days just on a 10-second span of sound and music.

=== Methodology ===
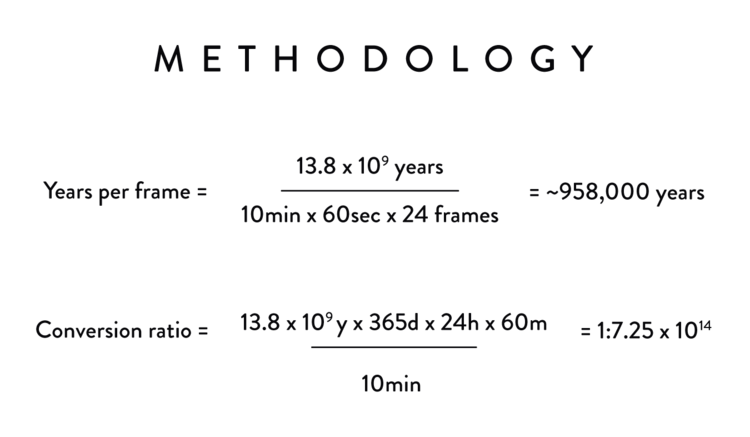
The methodology of time used in Timelapse of the Entire Universe. With Timelapse of the Future, the time per frame is just est. 0.5 months, or 15 days, at the start.

The method of time in the film is "a lot more thought and trickery" from the predecessor Timelapse of the Entire Universe, where every second is 22 million years, and that every frame is approximately 958,000 years, thus having 13.8 billion years in nearly 10 minutes. Boswell chose a different methodology in Timelapse of the Future, saying that:

It could have been every three seconds, and the video would have been over in fifteen minutes. But then you're really cramming a ton of stuff into the first few minutes. Everything from the present day to the death of the earth would've occurred in one minute instead of three to four. That would've made it really hard to breathe. But then you have to apply that same rule to the rest of the video, and ensure you've got enough stuff in there to fill the time. It's a balance.

In Timelapse of the Future, the time per frame reduces to approximately 0.5 months per frame (film is 24 fps) at the beginning, increasing as it evolves. It uses the calculation: 12/24 = 0.5, in which: 12 = months, 24 = frames rate, and 0.5 = months.

== Release ==
The first known tweet regarding the film was a tweet on July 21, 2018, about Pangea Ultima, an event featured on the film. The first tweet explicitly mentioning the production of the film was posted on October 10, as well as another tweet indirectly mentioning the film's ending eight days later. The first teaser was posted on Boswell's Patreon and Vimeo on February 1, 2019, followed by an announcement on his Patreon, mentioning the film "my most ambitious release yet." A photo of a scene in the film was leaked on Boswell's Twitter on March 15, followed by a 70-second teaser the next day.

The film was released on Boswell's YouTube channel Melodysheep on March 20, 17:15 UTC, with the premiere being a paid ad-free viewing available on his Patreon nine hours earlier. The film screened at event venue 393, New York City on May 2, using the multi-monitor format but the year counter invisible; his Patrons offered free tickets. Another screening in the Exploratorium, San Francisco, on July 25 at 9:30 pm PT took place, with the last screening in dubbing by Atomic Studio project with voice-over of Andrey Lysenko taking place in the historic Rodina Film Centre, St. Petersburg, Russia, on November 3 on 6:30 pm MSK, participating in The World of Knowledge International Film Festival. A hosted presentation at the Treefort Music Fest— specifically at its sister event Hackfort Fest— was supposed to take place on March 28, 2020, but was postponed to either September 23 or 2021 due to the COVID-19 pandemic.

The soundtrack was mainly released on Boswell's Bandcamp (as it is his hub), but also on Amazon for sale, Last.fm, SoundCloud (select tracks), Google Play Music, Spotify, etc. A hidden track was published only for his Patrons.

== Reception ==
The film received generally positive reviews online, by regular viewers, YouTubers, experts, and critics. Analytics company Social Blade reported high rise in viewership and subscription as the video was released, and is thus also categorized as viral. The film reached 10 thousand views on March 29, and the 10 million views point on May 21 as reported by Boswell. As of December 29, 2022, the film has 88,054,235 views, with 2.8 million likes. Based on the number of views the film has received, Social Blade estimated revenues of US$40,600 to US$324,500.

Aeon says that the film "impressively translat[es] theoretical physics and astronomically vast scales of time and space into 29 breathtaking minutes, [...] tak[ing] us [...] into the sublime of the unimaginable, with all the wonder and terror that might provoke." The Long Now Foundation writer Ahmed Kabil says that "The effect of [the Sun's] demise coming so early in the video is unsettling, akin to Hitchcock killing off Janet Leigh's character less than a third of the way through Psycho." Filmmaker Eugene Lee Yang said that it is "a breathtakingly brilliant education video that has rendered my perpetual existential crisis shook to its core." A writer from the Miami Herald referenced The Guerilla Film Makers Pocketbook by Chris Jones on the film. Michael Nielsen said: on Twitter "Gorgeous. We're in a golden age of explanation," adding "I always find this... odd, and must admit anticipation of that reaction is making me increasingly hesitant to post things like this." It has also been featured on futuretimeline.net. Psychedelia magazine Psysociety recommends it, leaning towards visuals and sound design. Publication La Boite Verte said that the music "complements [the breathtaking visuals] for a grandiose cosmic power."

Kevin Pang on G/O Media's digital publication The Takeout says, "I found the existential questions conjured frightening, but also sobering and breathtaking and beautiful. It has the ability to make viewers hold two opposing thoughts simultaneously—that everything is beautiful and none of it means a damn thing." The film has also been similarized with the novel Evolution by Stephen Baxter, as well as the novels of the Xeelee Sequence, with the comment: "All these works repeatedly lead readers to the limits of imagination – how one can imagine that superstrings or entire galaxies are used as weapons? And that's exactly how I feel about this video."

Scientists think that "the [film] is well done and sends a message 'very powerful about the humble role of humanity in the history of the universe,'" however, it is also criticized by IAC researcher Jonay González Hernández via El País for taking the confusing phrase by Sean Carroll "universes that have no intelligent life are infertile," in which Hernández states that "A universe in which there would be life of any of these types would be a fertile universe. But if we [look at the context], in the part where we talk about the creation of baby universes, it is logical to think that a fertile universe would be one in which there was a civilization intelligent enough or advanced enough to be able to create a new universe to escape from and, in that case, the phrase would make sense."

=== Inspiration ===
External video and playlists
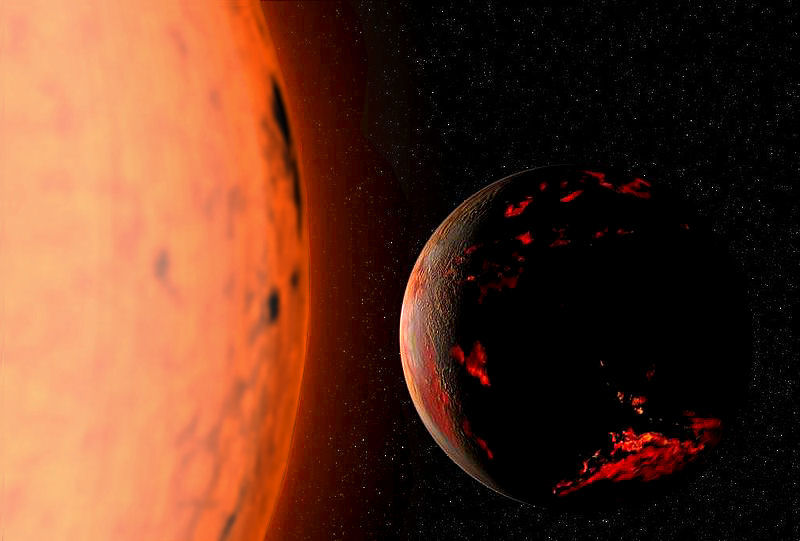
- The music video for "The End of Everything" (3 minutes 8 seconds)
- The playlist of the EP (all audio) The End of Everything (8 tracks)
- The playlist for the EP (partially video) The End of Everything (8 tracks)

Singer and actress Noah Cyrus released the music video for the song The End of Everything in collaboration with Boswell on May 19, 2020, in which she states that it is inspired by Timelapse of the Future. The music video is a refreshed art installation-like version of Timelapse of the Future, similar to the draft version tweeted by Boswell in 2018, with some points omitted to fit the song's duration, and with some points shuffled to fit the lyrics. Some of the videos on the other songs on the EP of the same name also used imageries from Boswell. Via her Instagram account, she states: "I had the pleasure of working with him on this as well. I've never been more inspired to go and write a song based on a visual." In an interview with NPR, she said:

Th[e film] hit my heart so heav[ily]. My mom is my best friend and I immediately started thinking about her when I watched this. My time with her and my family is so limited — and with everybody on this earth. The mountains that I look at outside of my window from my view, they're going to explode and obliterate and there's not going to be a me or a you or my mom or my dad. And there's something really terrifying, but also comforting about that, when you think about how much fear and how much hatred there is in the world, and that will also end.

For me, it really put into perspective how shortly lived our moments here as humans are. Situations from when I was younger started entering my head that I wanted to apologize for. There were people I wanted to reach out to that I hadn't checked in on in a while. There were wrongs that I felt needed to be made right. I realized I needed to appreciate the current moment more, and to let the ones I love know I love them. The message that what we have right now is what matters. Nothing else.

Boswell, who became the director of the music video, went to his Instagram account, saying: "She captured this subject more elegantly in 3 minutes than I could in 30. We worked together on creating a custom short-form version of my original piece to fit the song, which is hauntingly beautiful, as is the rest of her EP of the same name. Thanks to Noah and her team for making me a part of this."

== Accolades ==
Timelapse of the Future won the 2020 Webby Awards as the People's of Voice winner and Webby winner in the 'Science & Education General Video' category, with the 5-word speech being "Thanks a million, billion, trillion," making it his second and third Webby Award since his first for remixing quotes from Fred Rogers on PBS.

Year	Category	Award	Result
2019	N/A	World of Knowledge International Film Festival	Nominated
2020	People's of Voice	Webby Awards	Won
2020	Science & Education General Video	Webby Awards	Won

== Spin-off ==
On August 31, 2019, Boswell released a teaser for his next project, web series Life Beyond, which discovers extraterrestrial life and human's location in the universe, in a slowburn and nonlinear narrative technique, filled with science-fictitious imageries while holding its scientific genre. Its first episode, "The Dawn," was released on November 21, 17:00 UTC, with Boswell's Patrons getting an early look nine hours earlier. It was then revealed that the web series is a spin-off to Timelapse of the Future, in which Boswell described it as "a more optimistic perspective of human life and our place in the history of the universe." Boswell's Patrons also get to view a making-of of the film, as well as a bonus track. It gets generally positive reviews by viewers, and is promoted by the SETI Institute. Its second episode, "The Museum of Alien Life," was released on October 7, 2020. The theme is said to revolve around "mak[ing] contact with intelligent life, surviving the end of the universe, the physics of alien life, and more."^{30:15} In the third episode, "In Search of Giants," it will deal with "making contact with intelligent life, intergalactic civilizations, and surviving the end of the universe."

== In Internet culture ==
The film has caused several parody or similar videos/films to be posted on YouTube. One of the tracks in the soundtrack, "Ether," is used in Kevin James's satirical comedy short film CouchX. The title of a science fiction video game, Out There: Oceans of Time, was inspired by one of the soundtrack's songs, "Oceans of Time".

== Soundtrack ==
The title of the soundtrack album, The Arrow of Time, is taken from a narration in the film by Brian Cox:

The arrow of time creates a bright window in the universe's adolescence, during which life is possible. But its a window that doesn't stay open for long. As a fraction of the lifespan of the universe, as measured from its beginning to the evaporation of the last black hole, life, as we know it, is only possible for one thousandth of a billion billion billionth billion billion billionth billion billion billionth of a percent. (Note: Numerically, it is 0.0000000000000000000000000000000000000000000000000000000000000000000000000000000000001%, or $10^{-84}\%$. Life is naturally possible only until the last star dies — which also marks the end of the Stelliferous Era of the universe — at about 100 trillion years after the Big Bang. Dividing this period by the entire lifespan of the universe until its heat death at about $10^{100}$ (1 googol) years from now results in a mere $1/{10^{86}}$ (86 zeros before the decimal 1; 1 in 1 duooctagintillion) or $10^{-84}\%$.)

The Arrow of Time: Soundtrack to Timelapse of the Future

Soundtrack album by John Boswell
- Released: March 20, 2019
- Genre: Dark ambient, synth bass, dubstep, lounge, space, experimental
- Length: 31:28
- Producer: John Boswell

melodysheep chronology
Continuum E.P. (2018)	The Arrow of Time: Soundtrack to Timelapse of the Future (2019)	Life Beyond: Chapter 1 Original Soundtrack (2019)
- Does not include archived narrations.

This track list still does not include the hidden track posted on Boswell's Patreon.

All music is composed by John Boswell.

No.	Title	Length
1.	"Sun Mother"	3:36
2.	"The Somnium"	5:30
3.	"Ether"	1:54
4.	"Wither Away"	0:58
5.	"Afterlife"	0:51
6.	"Mesa"	1:11
7.	"Subterranean"	1:42
8.	"The Long Sleep"	1:43
9.	"Black Desert"	1:33
10.	"Hawking's Waltz"	1:15
11.	"Oceans of Time"	2:46
12.	"The Rising Dawn Bellows Like Thunder"	4:12
13.	"City of Ghosts"	1:32
14.	"Passage" (Bonus Track)	2:45
Total length:		31:28

== See also ==
- Future of Earth
- Global catastrophic risk
- Human extinction
- Big Crunch
- List of unsolved problems in astronomy
- Ultimate fate of the universe

=== Film assets ===
- 2012 (film)
- Geostorm
- Into the Universe with Stephen Hawking
- A Brief History of Time (film)
- Journey to the Edge of the Universe
- How the Universe Works
- Noah (2014 film)
- Deep Impact (film)
- Wonders of the Universe
- Voyage of Time
