= Jupiter-mass binary object =

Binary systems of planetary-mass objects

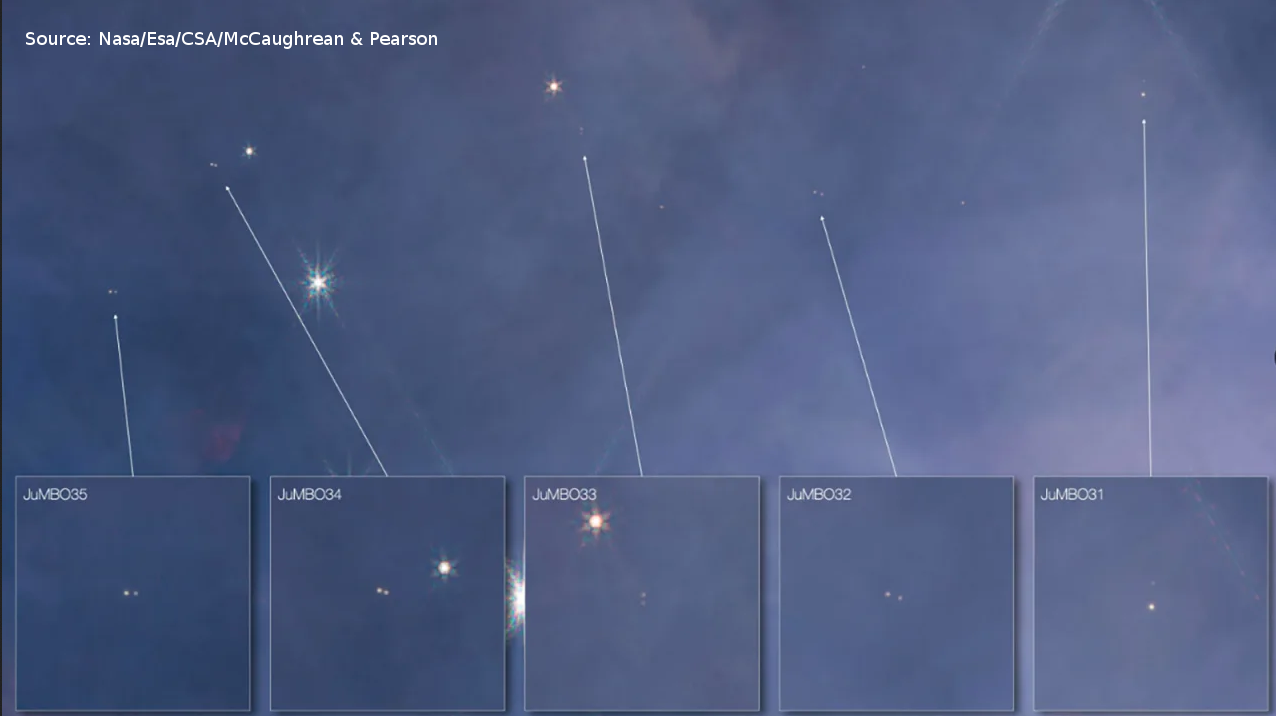
Images from JWST with disputed interpretations.

Jupiter-mass binary objects (JuMBOs) are a hypothetical class of celestial objects, defined as a planetary-mass objects orbiting a common center of mass. Reanalysis of early unpublished claims of their discovery was from observations of the Orion Nebula cluster by the James Webb Space Telescope identified background sources or brown dwarf stars, but no JuMBO objects.

== Observations ==
The full survey of the inner Orion Nebula and Trapezium Cluster made using the NIRCam instrument of the JWST.

Unsolved problem in astronomy
Do JuMBOs exist?
More unsolved problems in astronomy

JuMBOs were reported using data from the James Webb Space Telescope (JWST) survey of the Orion Nebula in late 2022. Using JWST's Near Infrared Camera (NIRCam), astronomers Samuel Pearson and Mark McCaughrean observed a 1.2 × 0.8 parsec region of the inner nebula and Trapezium Cluster over approximately 35 hours. The survey employed twelve different infrared filters specifically chosen to detect molecular absorption features characteristic of very low-mass objects.

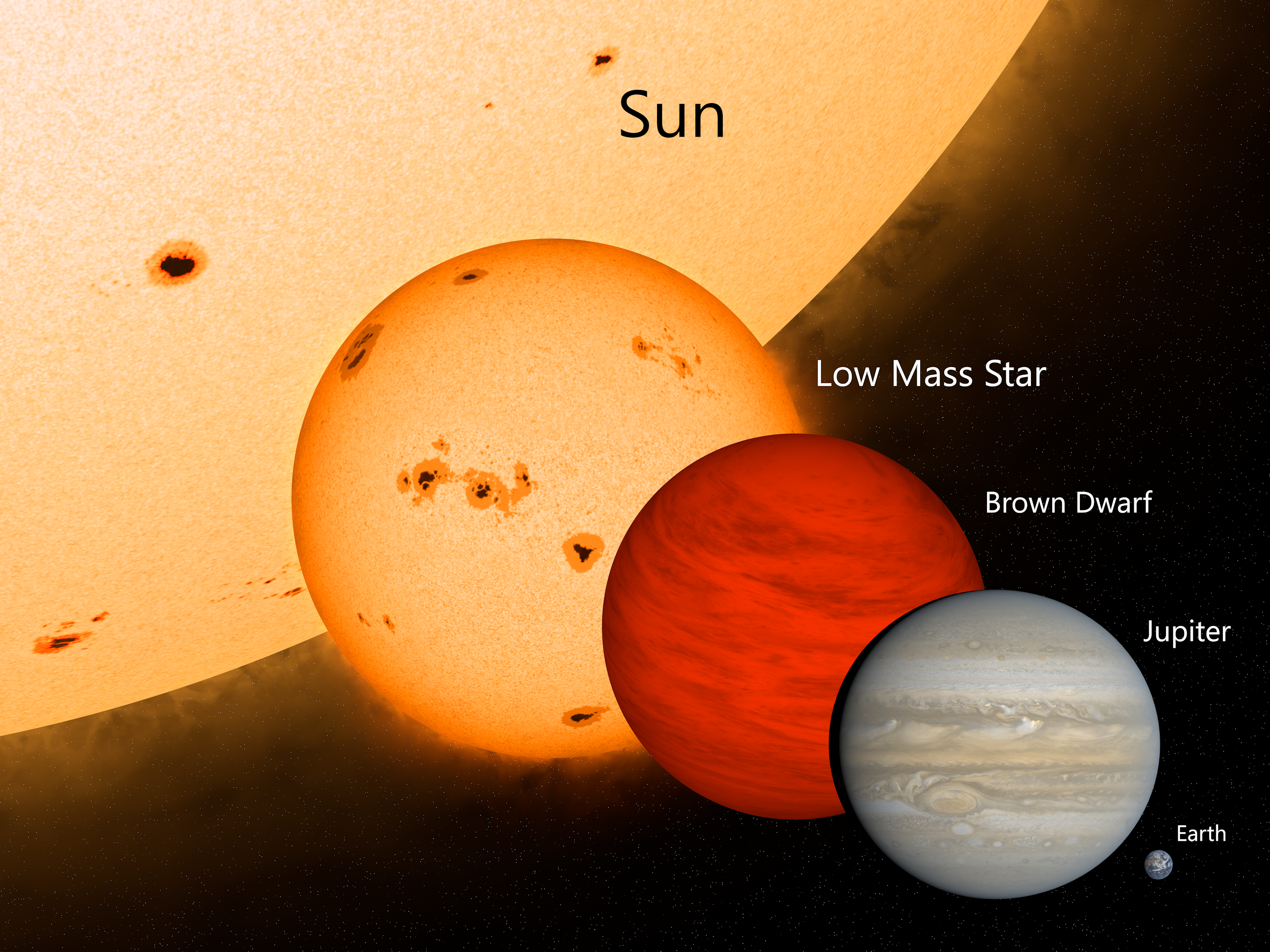
A size comparison between the Sun, a low mass star, a brown dwarf, Jupiter and Earth.

The planetary-mass objects were identified by looking for distinctive water and methane absorption patterns in their atmospheres. These molecular signatures appear as dips in brightness at specific wavelengths, allowing researchers to distinguish genuine planetary-mass objects from background stars that might appear similarly faint due to dust extinction. This method proved particularly effective for finding objects with temperatures between 890 and 2520 Kelvin.

The survey revealed 540 planetary-mass objects, with 40 binary systems and 2 triplets among them. Each component has a mass between 0.7 and 13 Jupiter masses (M_{J}), placing them in the planetary-mass regime. The binary pairs have separations ranging from 28 to 384 astronomical units. This discovery was unexpected because the proportion of objects appearing in binary pairs typically decreases with decreasing mass across stellar and brown dwarf populations. The high binary fraction of about 9% among these planetary-mass objects contradicted this established trend, suggesting a possible new formation mechanism.

Radio counterparts to JuMBO 24, which consists of two objects each with 11.5 Jupiter masses separated by 28 astronomical units, were found in the archives of observations of the Karl G. Jansky Very Large Array (VLA) of the National Radio Astronomy Observatory (NRAO) over three observations in 2012, 2018, and 2022. JuMBO 24 was however found to be a M5.5 background star with a mass of 0.1 to 0.15 M_{☉}.

The researchers found steady radio emission at both 6.1 and 10.0 GHz frequencies, with a consistent intensity of about 50 microJansky across both short and long timescales. The spatial extent of the radio emission matches infrared observations from JWST, indicating that both components of the binary system are producing radio waves. The object shows minimal proper motion, suggesting it is not moving rapidly relative to the Orion cluster. While the exact mechanism producing the radio emission remains unclear, its steady nature points to radiation from electrons in belts around the objects, similar to what occurs in ultracool dwarf stars but at much higher intensities than expected. The team was unable to detect any circular polarization in the radio waves, and searches for emission from other JuMBOs in the cluster were unsuccessful.

=== Conflicting results and rejected candidates ===
Astronomer Kevin Luhman reanalysed the NIRCam data and found that most JuMBOs did not appear in his sample of substellar objects. Moreover, the color was consistent with reddened background sources or low signal-to-noise sources. He considers only JuMBO 29 to be a good candidate for a binary planetary-mass system. JuMBO 24 was found to have a spectral type of M5.5 from a previous work. While faint, it could be a background star or a cluster member that is seen in scattered light. Additionally there are 26 components of the JuMBO pairs that are too faint for useful photometry. Another work by Luhman used NIRSpec spectroscopy, showing that for 7 JuMBOs (number 3, 5, 6, 10, 11, 14, 18) at least one component is a background source. This supports the previous result that most JuMBOs are not planetary-mass binaries.

Other theoretical study presented that most of the JuMBOs would not survive dynamical interactions of dense star-forming environment, so either many more were formed earlier on, or their association as gravitationally bound binary objects is incorrect.

== Formation theories ==
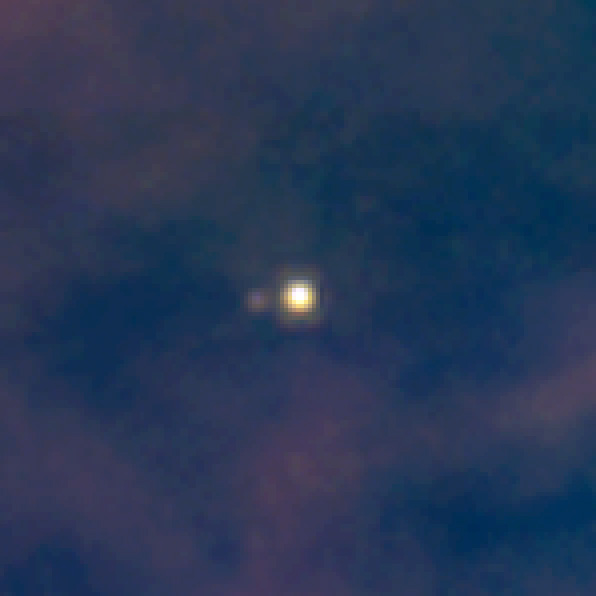
JuMBO 29, a candidate 12.5+3 M_{J} binary, separated by 135 AU

The discovery of 42 JuMBO systems among 540 free-floating Jupiter-mass objects was unexpected, as their 9% binary fraction exceeds that of slightly more massive brown dwarfs. Their wide separations also differ markedly from typical brown dwarf binaries, which have much closer separations around 4 astronomical units.

Current formation theories suggest JuMBOs may form when radiation from massive stars erodes fragmenting pre-stellar cores through a process called photoerosion. In this scenario, Lyman continuum radiation from massive stars drives an ionization shock front into a prestellar core that was already beginning to fragment into a binary system. This process simultaneously compresses the inner layers while evaporating the outer layers, resulting in a very low-mass binary system. The process appears most effective within HII regions created by massive stars, though many observed JuMBOs lie outside these regions in the Orion Nebula Cluster. This distribution suggests the objects may have migrated from their formation sites through dynamical interactions over time.

An extensive study argued that JuMBOs formed in situ, like stars. Through N-body simulations of different formation scenarios, the study found that JuMBOs most likely form directly alongside stars in the cluster, rather than through ejection from planetary systems or capture events. The other proposed mechanisms - ejection of planet pairs from stars, ejection of planet-moon systems, or capture of free-floating planets - failed to produce enough binaries or required unrealistic initial conditions.

The most successful model shows that JuMBOs form best about 0.2 million years after the stars, when the cluster environment has partially stabilized. This timing allows enough JuMBOs to survive to match the observed 8% binary fraction. The model also correctly predicts the observed orbital separations of 25-380 astronomical units and mass distributions. The lack of JuMBOs in older star clusters like Upper Scorpius is explained by their gradual destruction through gravitational interactions over time, with simulations predicting that only about 2% of the original pairs survive after 10 million years.

Another study shows that in simulations JuMBOs "could arise from the ejection of two giant planets following a close encounter with a passing star, if the two planets are nearly aligned at closest approach". However this work was challenged. According to computer modelling by Zwart and Hochart (2025), the model is incorrectly extrapolated to JuMBOs, and therefore the objects seen by JWST require another theory.

== Significance ==
JuMBOs were called "Impossible Enigmas That Come in Pairs" in The New York Times article. Astronomer Samuel Pearson of ESA commented that such objects "shouldn’t exist", as they question current theories of planet and star formation.
