= Timelapse of the Entire Universe =

2018 short film by John Boswell

- The YouTube thumbnail
- Written by: John Boswell
- Produced by: John Boswell
- Narrated by: Brian Cox; David Attenborough; Carl Sagan; Morgan Freeman (Note: Removed in revised version due to copyright infringement.); Toby Lockerbie (Note: Remaster)
- Edited by: John Boswell
- Music by: John Boswell
- Animation by: John Boswell (several); Others (several)
- Backgrounds by: John Boswell
- Production company: Amber Mountain Studios
- Distributed by: Amber Mountain Studios
- Release dates: March 7, 2018 (original version); March 10, 2018 (re-uploaded version); June 26, 2026 (remastered version)
- Running time: 10 minutes 49 seconds
- Country: United States
- Language: English

Timelapse of the Entire Universe is a 2018 short epic animated pseudo-documentary web film created by American astronomy-themed musician and filmmaker John D. Boswell. Inspired by the Cosmic Calendar, the 10-minute film is a hyperlapse of the universe from its start to current humanity, with every second representing 22 million years, with the entire humanity represented in a short time, using current knowledge. The film was originally released on Boswell's YouTube channel Melodysheep on March 7, but it was eventually taken down due to a copyright infringement regarding Morgan Freeman's voice. A revised version was uploaded 3 days later, on March 10, 2018. A year and 10 days later, a follow-up, Timelapse of the Future, was released. A remaster, with updated visuals and narrated by Boswell's friend Toby Lockerbie, released June 16, 2026.

== Plot ==
The Big Bang occurs, and the first stars are formed after the mixture of elements. Gravity then expands the universe to seemingly infinite proportions, and galaxies begin to form. Some galaxies form so close together that they are attracted to each other by gravity and collide, fusing together. However, despite its wondrous creation, gravity also creates mayhem in the form of a supermassive or stellar mass black hole, a region where not even light can escape its attraction, making its gravitational singularity invisible to outsiders.

Throughout the universe, conflicts between energy and gravity repeat every time, making a star die as a supernova when it runs out of fuel, causing new stars to be born. A particular protoplanetary dust cloud collapses, causing the birth of the Sun 5,264 mya (5.264 bya). The Solar System is then formed; among its planets is the Earth. A protoplanet, Theia, collides with Earth, forming the Moon.

Earth is initially in the Hadean and Archean Eons, during which it is covered in lava and ravaged by volcanoes. However, microorganisms still manage to form below the ocean. Although still not known, the latest theories suggest that chemicals from submarine volcanoes make the right recipe to create life. 2,490 mya (2.49 bya), the oxygenation of the atmosphere begins, allowing animals to arise. The Proterozoic Eon begins 1,402 mya (1.402 bya), but its benefits are delayed by the Snowball Earth, the biggest ice age in the planet's history. After the ice age ends, the benefits of the eon come to life; animals start to literally be born. More advanced plants start to evolve, followed by dinosaurs in the Triassic Period, which then go extinct during the Cretaceous–Paleogene extinction event. More plants evolve rapidly, followed by the rise of the mammals, especially primates such as Australopithecus afarensis, Homo erectus, Neanderthals, Homo sapiens, and Novus homo. A human eye, representing the entirety of humanity, is shown in just a fraction (1/24) of a second.

== Production ==
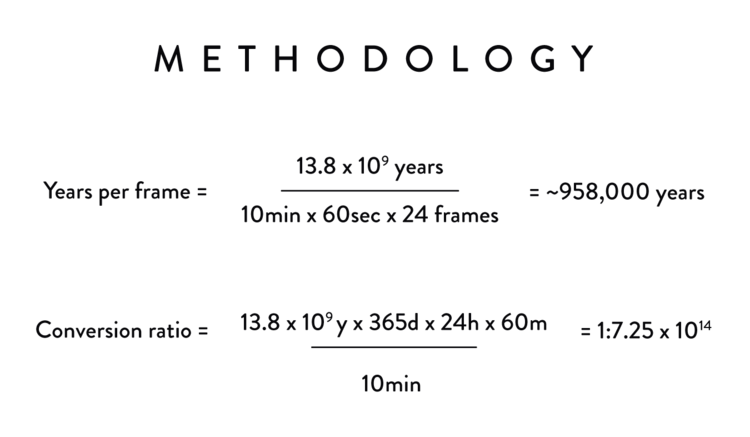
The methodology used in Timelapse of the Entire Universe.

In 2012, a short, one-and-a-half-minute film by Boswell, Our Story in 1 Minute, is published. It is a shorter version of Timelapse of the Entire Universe, specifically in one minute and 29 seconds, and used closed captions to evoke reflection on humanity. It also used imageries from this film.

Boswell stated that the film "shows how young we really are and how ancient and vast our universe is." The film was inspired by the Cosmic Calendar by Carl Sagan, in which Boswell later implemented it by creating a stripe similar to of the Cosmic Calendar. Research for the creation of the film was started on the Wikipedia article "Geologic time scale." Every second represents 22 million years in the film.

Boswell is supported by computer scientist Juan Benet, which makes his company Protocol Labs, an open-source R&D lab, credited.

== Release ==
Announcement of the film was posted on Boswell's Twitter on February 9, 2018. The film was originally published on Boswell's channel Melodysheep on March 7, but is taken down by YouTube due to copyright infringement. A revised version was published on March 10, with the voice of Morgan Freeman removed.

== Reception ==
The film received generally positive reviews. Writer Alex Shoolman said that it "gives an amazing overview of how our universe formed, the stars, galaxies, simple and complex life." César Noragueda of publication Hipertextual said that "There is no doubt that our long-awaited Carl Sagan [...] would love John Boswell's new video on the history of the universe." Laughing Squid said, "Against this stunning visual, Boswell provided a mesmerizing soundtrack, which included a seamless mashup of four iconic narrators – Morgan Freeman, Brian Cox, Carl Sagan and Sir David Attenborough – calmly explaining how [the universe] all came into place." The International Business Times and Cadena SER also gave it a positive review.

== Soundtrack ==
Continuum E.P.

Soundtrack album by John Boswell
- Released: May 7, 2018
- Genres: Orchestra, electronic
- Length: 15:40
- Producer: John Boswell

melodysheep chronology
Symphony of Science Collector's Edition (2013)	Continuum E.P. (2018)	The Arrow of Time: Soundtrack to Timelapse of the Future (2019)
- Does not include archive narrations.

All music is composed by John Boswell.

No.	Title	Length
1.	"First Moments"	2:48
2.	"Plateau"	2:56
3.	"Rebirth"	3:19
4.	"Empires Lost"	2:17
5.	"Rai Stones"	2:22
6.	"Chapters of Time"	1:58
Total length:		15:40

== Sequel ==
A follow-up, Timelapse of the Future, was posted a year and 10 days after Timelapse of the Entire Universe's revised release. It is a hyperlapse of the possible timeline of the far future, with the lapse doubling every five seconds instead of being consistent.

== See also ==
- Psychedelia
- Chronology of the universe
- Timeline of cosmological epochs
- Timeline of natural history
- List of unsolved problems in geoscience

=== Film assets ===
- Voyage of Time
- Cosmic Voyage
- Wonders of the Universe
