= List of unsolved problems in astronomy =

This article is a list of notable unsolved problems in astronomy. Problems may be theoretical or experimental. Theoretical problems result from inability of current theories to explain observed phenomena or experimental results. Experimental problems result from inability to test or investigate a proposed theory. Other problems involve unique events or occurrences that have not repeated themselves with unclear causes.

== Planetary astronomy ==
=== Solar System ===
- Orbiting bodies and rotation:
  - Are there any non-dwarf planets beyond Neptune?
  - Why do extreme trans-Neptunian objects have elongated orbits?
  - The rotation rate of Saturn:
    - Why does the magnetosphere of Saturn rotate at a rate close to that at which the planet's clouds rotate?
    - What is the rotation rate of Saturn's deep interior?
- Satellite geomorphology:
  - What is the origin of the chain of high mountains that closely follows the equator of Saturn's moon, Iapetus?
    - Are the mountains the remnant of hot and fast-rotating young Iapetus?
    - Are the mountains the result of material (either from the rings of Saturn or its ring) that over time collected upon the surface?

=== Extra-solar and exoplanets ===
- How common are Solar System-like planetary systems? (Some observed planetary systems contain Super-Earths and Hot Jupiters that orbit very close to their stars. Systems with Jupiter-like planets in Jupiter-like orbits appear to be rare. There are several possibilities as to why Jupiter-like orbits are rare, including that data is lacking or the grand tack hypothesis.)
  - What is the range of planetary system architectures?
- Do Jupiter-mass Binary Objects (JuMBOs) exist?
- What are the processes that lead to planetary diversity?
- Is planetary formation fast or slow?

== Stellar astronomy and solar physics ==
- Solar cycle:
  - How does the Sun generate its periodically reversing large-scale magnetic field?
  - How do other Sun-like stars generate their magnetic fields, and what are the similarities and differences between stellar activity cycles and that of the Sun?
  - What caused the Maunder Minimum and other grand minima, and how does the solar cycle recover from a minimum state?
- What is the cause of solar wind?
- Coronal heating problem:
  - Why is the Sun's corona so much hotter than the Sun's surface?
  - Why is the magnetic reconnection effect many orders of magnitude faster than predicted by standard models?
- Space weather prediction:
  - How does the Sun produce strong southward-pointing magnetic fields in solar coronal mass ejections that lead to geomagnetic storms? How can we predict solar and geomagnetic super-storms?
- Why sunspots sometimes form in pairs?
- What is the cause of solar flares?
- Solar polarization:
  - How should resonance scattering polarization be calculated when photons have finite coherence length?
  - Why there is a violation of Hale's polarity law? (Measurements issues or theory issue?)
- ~~Voyager paradox:~~
  - ~~Voyager 1 crossed the termination shock in 2004 without detecting the anticipated local anomalous cosmic rays source peak, proposed by almost all models.~~ The Voyager paradox ended in 2012 with Voyager 1 passing the Heliosphere

== Astrophysics ==
- What is the origin of the stellar mass spectrum? That is, why do astronomers observe the same distribution of stellar masses—the initial mass function—apparently regardless of the initial conditions?
- Supernova: What is the mechanism by which an implosion of a dying star becomes an explosion? What are the progenitors of a supernova?
- p-nuclei: What astrophysical process is responsible for the nucleogenesis of these rare isotopes?
- Fast radio bursts (FRBs): What causes these transient radio pulses from distant galaxies, lasting a few milliseconds each? Why do some FRBs repeat at unpredictable intervals but many others do not? Several models have been proposed but no one theory has become widely accepted.
- The Oh-My-God particle and other ultra-high-energy cosmic rays: What physical processes create cosmic rays whose energy exceeds the GZK cutoff?
- Nature of KIC 8462852, commonly known as Tabby's Star: What is the origin of the unusual luminosity changes of this star?
- What are the source and origin of the IBEX ribbon?
- How does stellar multiplicity affect the life and death of stars?
- What are the most extreme stars and stellar populations?
- How do star-forming structures form from the diffuse interstellar medium? How do these structures interact with the ISM?

== Galactic astronomy and astrophysics ==
Rotation curve of a typical spiral galaxy: predicted (A) and observed (B). Can the discrepancy between the curves be attributed to dark matter?

- Galaxy rotation problem: Is dark matter (solely) responsible for differences in observed and theoretical speed of stars revolving around the center of galaxies?
- Age–metallicity relation in the Galactic disk: Is there a universal age–metallicity relation (AMR) in the Galactic disk (both "thin" and "thick" parts of the disk)? In the local (primarily thin) disk of the Milky Way, there appears to be no evidence of a strong AMR. A sample of 229 nearby "thick" disk stars has been used to investigate the existence of an age–metallicity relation in the Galactic thick disk and indicates that there is an age–metallicity relation present in the thick disk. Stellar ages from asteroseismology confirm the lack of any strong age–metallicity relation in the Galactic disc.
  - How do gas, metals, and dust flow into, through, and out of galaxies?
- Ultraluminous X-ray sources (ULXs): What powers X-ray sources that are not associated with active galactic nuclei but exceed the Eddington limit of a neutron star or stellar black hole? Are they due to intermediate-mass black holes? Some ULXs are periodic, suggesting non-isotropic emission from a neutron star. Does this apply to all ULXs? How could such a system form and remain stable?
- What is the origin of the Galactic Center GeV excess? Is it due to the annihilation of dark matter particles or a new population of millisecond pulsars?
- The infrared/TeV crisis: Lack of attenuation of very energetic gamma rays from extragalactic sources.
- What is the nature of Little Red Dots?
- How do galactic history and dark matter halos impact the observable properties of galaxies?
- How did the intergalactic medium and the first sources of radiation evolve from cosmic dawn through the epoch of reionization?

== Black holes ==
- Gravitational singularities: Does general relativity break down in the interior of a black hole due to quantum effects, torsion, or other phenomena?
- No-hair theorem:
  - Do black holes have an internal structure? If so, how might the internal structure be probed?
- Supermassive black holes:
  - What is the origin of the M–sigma relation between supermassive black hole mass and galaxy velocity dispersion?
  - What seeds supermassive black holes and how do they grow?
  - How is the growth of supermassive black holes related to evolution of their host galaxies?
- The formation of high-redshift quasars:
  - How do the most distant quasars grow their supermassive black holes up to 10^{10} solar masses so early in the history of the universe (with redshift greater than 6 to 7)?
- Black hole information paradox and black hole radiation:
  - Do black holes produce thermal radiation, as expected on theoretical grounds?
    - If so—meaning black holes can evaporate away—what happens to the information stored in them? This appears to be an issue because the unitarity of quantum mechanics does not allow for the destruction of information. Does the radiation stop at some point for black hole remnants?
- Firewalls: Do firewalls exist around black holes?
- Final parsec problem: Supermassive black holes appear to have merged, and what appears to be a pair in this intermediate range has been observed, in PKS 1302–102. However, theory predicts that when supermassive black holes reach a separation of about one parsec, it may take billions of years to orbit closely enough to merge—greater than the age of the universe.
- What are the astrophysical formation channels behind the binary black hole mergers observed through gravitational waves?
- Naked singularity: Is the cosmic censorship hypothesis correct? Can a naked singularity exist?
- What are the mass and spin distributions of stellar mass black holes?

== Cosmology ==
Estimated distribution of dark matter and dark energy in the universe

- Cosmological principle:
  - Is the universe homogeneous and isotropic at sufficiently large scales, as claimed by the cosmological principle and assumed by all models that use the Friedmann–Lemaître–Robertson–Walker (FLRW) metric, including the current version of the ΛCDM model, or is the universe inhomogeneous or anisotropic?
  - Is the CMB dipole purely kinematic, or does it signal anisotropy of the universe, resulting in the breakdown of the FLRW metric and the cosmological principle?
  - Is the Hubble tension evidence that the cosmological principle is false?
  - If the cosmological principle is correct, is the FLRW metric the correct metric describing the universe?
  - Are the observations interpreted as the accelerating expansion of the universe correctly interpreted, or are they instead evidence that the cosmological principle is false?
  - Copernican principle: Are cosmological observations made from Earth representative of observations from the other positions in the universe?
- Dark matter:
  - What is the identity and composition of dark matter?
  - Is dark matter a particle? If so, is it a WIMP, an axion, the lightest superpartner (LSP), or something else?
  - Do the phenomena attributed to dark matter point to an extension of gravity instead of some other type of matter?
- Dark energy:
  - What causes the observed accelerating expansion of the universe (the de Sitter phase)?
  - Are the observations showing the accelerating expansion of the universe correctly interpreted, or are they evidence that the cosmological principle is false?
  - Why is the energy density of the dark energy component of the same magnitude as the density of matter at present when the two evolve quite differently over time? Could this observation be a coincidence of timing?
  - Is dark energy a pure cosmological constant or are models of quintessence such as phantom energy applicable?
  - Do early dark energy models resolve the Hubble tension?
- Baryon asymmetry: Why is there far more matter than antimatter in the observable universe?
- Cosmological constant problem:
  - Why does the zero-point energy of the vacuum not cause a large cosmological constant?
- Size and shape of the universe:
  - The diameter of the observable universe is approximately 93 billion light-years; what is the size of the whole universe? Is it infinite?
  - What is the 3-manifold of comoving space, i.e. of a comoving spatial section of the universe, informally called the "shape" of the universe?
    - Neither the curvature nor the topology is presently known, though the curvature is known to be "close" to zero on observable scales. The cosmic inflation hypothesis suggests that the shape of the universe may be unmeasurable. Since 2003, Jean-Pierre Luminet, et al., and other groups have suggested that the shape of the universe may be the Poincaré dodecahedral space. Is the shape unmeasurable, the Poincaré space, or another 3-manifold?
- Cosmic inflation:
  - Is the theory of cosmic inflation in the very early universe correct? If so, what are the details of this epoch?
  - What is the hypothetical inflaton scalar field that gave rise to this cosmic inflation?
  - If inflation happened at a single point, is it self-sustaining through inflation of quantum-mechanical fluctuations and thus ongoing in some extremely distant place?
- Horizon problem:
  - Why is the distant universe so homogeneous when the Big Bang theory seems to predict larger measurable anisotropies of the night sky than those observed?
    - Cosmological inflation is generally accepted as the solution, but are other possible explanations such as a variable speed of light more appropriate?
- Hubble tension: If ΛCDM is correct, why are measurements of the Hubble constant failing to converge?
- Axis of evil: Some large features of the microwave sky at distances of over 13 billion light-years appear to be aligned with both the motion and orientation of the Solar System. Is this due to systematic errors in processing, contamination of results by local effects, or an unexplained violation of the Copernican principle?
- Origin of the Universe
  - Why is there something rather than nothing?
  - How did the conditions for anything to exist arise? What set the hot Big Bang in motion?
  - Is there potentially an infinite amount of unknown astronomical phenomena throughout our entire universe?
- Fate of the universe
  - Is the universe heading toward a Big Freeze, a Big Rip, a Big Crunch, or a Big Bounce, or is it part of an infinitely recurring cyclic model?
  - How will measurements of gravitational waves impact cosmological models?
- Multiverse:
  - Is there a multiverse and is such a concept relevant? Are such ideas scientifically testable or will they forever remain in the realm of pseudoscience? Are such metaphysical questions interpretable in the fields of cosmology, astronomy, physics, or any other scientific discipline?
  - Are metaphysical approaches such as the anthropic principle necessary to explain unsolved questions such as the cosmological constant problem?

== Extraterrestrial life ==
- Is there other life in the Solar System? Especially:
  - Is there past or present life on Mars? Of particular interest is the biosignature detected in a rock in Jezero Crater by NASA rover Perseverance.
  - Is there past or present life on Jupiter's moons? Promising candidates are Europa, Ganymede, and Callisto, which are believed to have subsurface oceans of liquid water. The ESA launched the Jupiter Icy Moons Explorer in 2023 to explore the three moons. NASA launched the Europa Clipper in 2024 that has the Surface Dust Analyser mass spectrometer which can identify traces of organic compounds (amongst other things).
- Is there other life in the Universe? Especially:
  - Is there other intelligent life?
  - Is there potentially an infinite amount of extraterrestrial genera throughout our universe? If so, what is the explanation for the Fermi paradox?
- Nature of Wow! signal:
  - Was this singular event a result of any extraterrestrial phenomenon? If so, what was its origin?
- How do habitable environments arise and evolve within the context of planetary systems? How can the signs of habitable life be identified and interpreted in the context of planetary systems?

== See also ==
- Lists of unsolved problems
- List of unsolved problems in physics
