= List of unsolved problems in biology =

Biological concepts and questions with insufficient resolutions

This article lists notable unsolved problems in biology.

== General biology ==
=== Evolution and origins of life ===
- Origin of life. Exactly how, where, and when did life on Earth originate? Which, if any, of the many hypotheses is correct? What were the metabolic pathways used by the earliest life forms? How did genetic code originate? What was the molecular mechanism that allows the association of the amino acids with their triplet codons? What were the biochemical paths from individual bio-building blocks like amino acids or nucleic acids to functional polymers such as proteins and DNA?
- Origin of sexual reproduction. What were the fundamental selective forces responsible for the origin of sexual reproduction?
- Maintenance of sexual reproduction. What are the fundamental selective forces maintaining sexual reproduction?
- Origins of viruses (Virus World). Exactly how and when did different groups of viruses originate?
- Morphology problem. How are neural tissues formed in specific ways in different species? The formation of neural tissues in a certain way is necessary for the formation of certain goal-directed behavior for certain species. Developmental psychobiology posed this question since the lack of knowledge about the precise coordination of all cells, even those not related anatomically, in space and time during the embryonic period does not allow us to understand what forces at the cellular level coordinate four very general classes of tissue deformation, namely: tissue folding and invagination, tissue flow and extension, tissue hollowing, and, finally, tissue branching.
- Development and evolution of the brain. How and why did the brain evolve? What are the molecular determinants of individual brain development?
- Origin of Eukaryotes (Symbiogenesis). How and why did cells combine to form the eukaryotic cell? Did one or more random events lead to the first eukaryotic cells, or can the formation of eukaryotic cells be explained by physical and biological principles? How did the mitochondria's mitosis cycle come in sync with its host cell? Did the mitochondria or the nucleus develop first in eukaryotes?
- Last universal common ancestor. What were the characteristics of the Last Universal Common Ancestor of Archaea and Bacteria?
- The lipid divide: How did archaea end up using membrane glycerophospholipids of the opposite chirality compared to bacteria? Why do eukaryotes have bacteria-type membrane lipids?

=== Biochemistry and cell biology ===
- Biological homochirality. What is the origin of homochirality in living organisms? In biological organisms, amino acids appear almost exclusively in the left-handed form and sugars in the right-handed form. Homochirality is an obvious characteristic of life on Earth, yet extraterrestrial samples contain largely racemic compounds. It is not known whether homochirality existed before life, whether the building blocks of life must have this particular chirality, or whether life must be homochiral at all.
- What do all the unknown proteins do? Two decades since the first eukaryotes were sequenced, the "biological role" of around 20% of proteins are still unknown. Many of these proteins are conserved across most eukaryotic species and some are conserved in bacteria, indicating a role fundamental for life.
- Determinants of cell size. How do cells determine what size to grow to before dividing?
- Golgi apparatus. In cell theory, what is the exact transport mechanism by which proteins travel through the Golgi apparatus?
- Mechanism of action of drugs. The mechanisms of action of many drugs including lithium, thalidomide, and ketamine are not completely understood.
- Protein folding. What is the folding code? What is the folding mechanism? Can the native structure of a protein be predicted from its amino acid sequence? Is it possible to predict the secondary, tertiary and quaternary structure of a polypeptide sequence based solely on the sequence and environmental information?
  - Prediction of native structure has turned out to be the easiest of the questions, as the variety of known structures have allowed the development of prediction methods such as Rosetta (since 1998) and the AlphaFold neural network of 2020. AlphaFold is capable of predicting a protein's final shape based solely on its amino-acid chain with an accuracy of around 90% on a test sample of proteins used by the team. Accurate prediction of quaternary structure was achieved by AlphaFold3 in 2024.
  - Inverse protein-folding problem (protein design): Is it possible to design a polypeptide sequence which will adopt a given structure under certain environmental conditions? This turned out to be tractable given a good structural prediction method, starting with the success of the small globular protein Top7 from the Rosetta team in 2002. The use of structure-prediction neural networks afforded even more complex designs. Large language models trained on protein sequences seem to learn a "grammar"; they represent yet another approach to the protein-design problem.
  - The success of prediction and design methods still skip over how proteins end up in the final shape (folding mechanism and kinetics; protein dynamics). Wet lab methods of the 2020s allow for microsecond-level changes to be observed and quantified. 2020s molecular dynamics techniques can be used to simulate the folding behavior at the atomic level to this same timescale, though a specialized computer is needed for the simulation to finish in a reasonable amount of time. See also Folding@home.
  - The study of intrinsically disordered proteins is also not as advanced as the study of globular proteins: some sequences do not fold into a fixed shape yet still have a function.
- Enzyme kinetics: Why do some enzymes exhibit faster-than-diffusion kinetics?
- RNA folding problem: Is it possible to accurately predict the secondary, tertiary and quaternary structure of a polyribonucleic acid sequence based on its sequence and environment?
- Protein design: Is it possible to design highly active enzymes de novo for any desired reaction?
- Biosynthesis: Can desired molecules, natural products or otherwise, be produced in high yield through biosynthetic pathway manipulation?
- What is the mechanism of allosteric transitions of proteins? The concerted and sequential models have been hypothesised but neither has been verified.
- What are the endogenous ligands of orphan receptors?
- What substance is endothelium-derived hyperpolarizing factor?
- Mechanism of Golgi's method: Why does this specific method stain nerve tissues? Why does it only color a random portion of the cells?

=== Other ===
- Why does biological aging occur? There are a number of hypotheses as to why senescence occurs including those that it is programmed by gene expression changes and that it is the accumulative damage of biological structures, particularly damage to DNA.
- How do organs grow to the correct shape and size? How are the final shape and size of organs so reliably formed? These processes are in part controlled by the Hippo signaling pathway.
- Can developing biological systems tell the time? To an extent, this appears to be the case, as shown by the CLOCK gene.
- Star jelly. A complete explanation about its origins is still lacking.
- Forest rings. The origin of forest rings is not known, despite several mechanisms for their creation having been proposed. Such hypotheses include radially growing fungus, buried kimberlite pipes, trapped gas pockets, and meteorite impact craters.

== Human biology ==
- Handedness: It is unclear how handedness develops, what purpose it serves, why right-handedness is far more common, and why left-handedness exists.
- Laughter: While it is generally accepted that laughing evolved as a form of social communication, the exact neurobiological process that leads humans to laugh is not well understood.
- Yawning: It is yet to be established what the biological or social purpose of yawning is.
- Heritable components of homosexuality: How to reconcile evolution with the heritable components of human homosexuality? Homosexuality is prevalent across human societies, past and present. These facts constitute an evolutionary puzzle.
- Decline in average human body temperature since the 19th century: Medical data suggests that the average body temperature has declined 0.6 °C since the 19th century. The cause is unclear although it has been suggested that it has some relation with reduced inflammation from reduced exposure to microorganisms.
- Why are there blood types? It is unclear what the origin and purpose of having blood types is. It is thought that O blood may be an adaptation to malaria and that different blood types respond to different diseases but this hypothesis has yet to be proven. Why did these antigens develop in the first place? What accounts for the differences in blood type? How ancient are the differences in blood types? What accounts for the large number of rare non ABO blood types? What role do blood types have in fighting disease?
- Photic sneeze effect: What causes the photic sneeze effect? Why is it so common yet not universal?
- Human sex pheromones: There is contradictory evidence on the existence of human pheromones. Do they actually exist, and if so, how do they affect behavior?
- Existence of the Grafenberg spot (G-spot): Does the G-spot actually exist? If so is it present in all women? What exactly is it?
- Extinction of archaic humans: Why did archaic human species such as Neanderthals become extinct, leaving Homo sapiens the only surviving species of humans?
- Love: When did pair bonding evolve? Is pair bonding an antecedent to romantic love, or have there been other steps in the evolution of pair bonds in humans (e.g. a seasonal bond)? A theory exists that romantic love evolved by co-opting the systems for mother-infant bonding, but this does not explain when or why (under what selection pressure) romantic love evolved.

=== Neuroscience and cognition ===
==== Neurophysiology ====
- Neuroplasticity: How plastic is the mature brain?
- General anaesthetic: What is the mechanism by which general anesthetics work?
- Neuropsychiatric diseases: What are the neural bases (causes) of mental diseases like psychotic disorders (e.g. mania, schizophrenia), Parkinson's disease, Alzheimer's disease, or addiction? Is it possible to recover loss of sensory or motor function?
- Neural computation: What are all the different types of neuron and what do they do in the brain?

==== Cognition and psychology ====
- Cognition and decisions: How and where does the brain evaluate reward value and effort (cost) to modulate behavior? How does previous experience alter perception and behavior? What are the genetic and environmental contributions to brain function?
- Computational neuroscience: How important is the precise timing of action potentials for information processing in the neocortex? Is there a canonical computation performed by cortical columns? How is information in the brain processed by the collective dynamics of large neuronal circuits? What level of simplification is suitable for a description of information processing in the brain? What is the neural code?
- Computational theory of mind: What are the limits of understanding thinking as a form of computing?
- Consciousness: What is the brain basis of subjective experience, cognition, wakefulness, alertness, arousal, and attention? What is the precise mechanism behind how phenomenal binding occurs? Is there a "hard problem of consciousness"? If so, how is it solved? What, if any, is the function of consciousness, and what is the mechanism behind the function of consciousness?
- Free will: Do humans or other organisms possess free will? Particularly studied by the neuroscience of free will.
- Language: How is it implemented neurally? What is the basis of semantic meaning?
- Learning and memory: Where do our memories get stored and how are they retrieved again? How can learning be improved? What is the difference between explicit and implicit memories? What molecule is responsible for synaptic tagging?
- The emergence and evolution of intelligence: What are the laws and mechanisms of new idea emergence (insight, creativity synthesis, intuition, decision-making, eureka); development (evolution) of an individual mind in ontogenesis, etc.?
- Perception: How does the brain transfer sensory information into coherent, private percepts? What are the rules by which perception is organized? What are the features/objects that constitute our perceptual experience of internal and external events? How are the senses integrated? What is the relationship between subjective experience and the physical world?

== Non-human biology ==
=== Ecology, evolution, and paleontology ===
Unsolved problems relating to the interactions between organisms and their distribution in the environment include:

- Paradox of the plankton. The high diversity of phytoplankton seems to violate the competitive exclusion principle.
- Ediacaran biota. How should Ediacaran biota be classified? Even what kingdom they belong to is unclear. Why were they so decisively displaced by Cambrian biota?
- Cambrian explosion. What is the cause of the apparent rapid diversification of multicellular animal life around the beginning of the Cambrian, resulting in the emergence of almost all modern animal phyla?
- Darwin's abominable mystery of botany/plants. What is the exact evolutionary history of flowers and what is the cause of the apparently sudden appearance of nearly modern flowers in the fossil record?
- Adult form of Facetotecta. The adult form of this animal has never been encountered in the water, and it remains a mystery what it grows into.
- Origin of snakes. Did snakes evolve from burrowing lizards or aquatic lizards? There is evidence for both hypotheses.
- Origin of turtles. Did turtles evolve from anapsids or diapsids? There is evidence for both hypotheses.
- Paleodictyon: What is the origin of this trace fossil and its modern counterparts? Despite many theories proposed, no evidence has been found to confirm any of them.
- Francevillian biota: were they early multicellular organisms?
- Snowball Earth: what was the effect of Cryogenian glaciations on the origin and evolution of early animals?
- Eocyathispongia: is it an early sponge? Did it have choanocytes?
- Vernanimalcula guizhouena: is this fossil organism an early bilaterian?
- Tullimonstrum: a taxonomic position of this fossil organism is unknown.
- Adult form of Planctosphaera pelagica, a hemichordate known, as of 2023, only by its tornaria larvae. Due to differences between larvae of acorn worms and that of Planctosphaera pelagica, Planctosphaera is sometimes given its own class.
- Xenacoelomorpha: are they deuterostomes, forming a clade Xenambulacraria together with echinoderms and hemichordates, or rather primitive bilaterians and a sister group to Nephrozoa?
- Jennaria pulchra: the taxonomic position of this animal is unknown and more research is needed to establish it.
- Nervous system of Lobatocerebrida. Why do these simple unsegmented annelids, which are unselective deposit feeders and lack sense organs, have a relatively complex brain?
- Diurodrilus: is it an unusual annelid? What are the origins of morphological similarities between Diurodrilus and micrognathozoan Limnognathia maerski?
- Taxonomic position of pentastomids. Are they a sister group to Argulidae or an ancient lineage of Panarthropoda?
- Taxonomic position of Tricholepidion gertschi: is it a member of the order Zygentoma (silverfishes) or an independent ancient lineage of insects?
- How will organisms respond to complex, novel environments? Climate change is of significant relevance.
- What is the relative importance of variability, across scales, and its mechanisms?
- Why does intragenotypic variability persist? Striking phenotypic differences exist even among individuals with identical genotypes, and environments.
- What determines population density? There is disagreement over which regulatory mechanisms of population are density-dependent, or density-independent.
- Why are all leaves the size they are, and not an order of magnitude larger or smaller? How is the upper limit on leaf size set?
- Persistence paradox: why does the evolution of novel species almost never lead to the extinction of resident species?
- Is the ecosystem a superorganism, or a collection of organisms? Could the Earth be a superorganism, or a unit of selection?
- Why do Pogonomyrmex badius colonies cover the surface of their nests with a circular region of charcoal pieces?

=== Ethology ===
Unsolved problems relating to the behaviour of animals include:

- Homing. A satisfactory explanation for the neurobiological mechanisms that allow homing in animals has yet to be found.
- Flocking (behavior). How flocks of birds and bats coordinate their movements so quickly is not fully understood. Nor is the purpose of large flocks like those of starlings which seem to invite predators rather than protect them.
- Butterfly migration. How do the descendants of monarch butterfly all over Canada and the US eventually, after migrating for several generations, manage to return to a few relatively small overwintering spots?
- Blue whale. There is not much data on the sexuality of the blue whale.
- Gall-inducing insects. At least seven groups of insects, in six orders, have independently evolved the gall-inducing habit. Several adaptation hypotheses have been proposed, but it is largely unknown why this habit evolved and how gall-inducing insects induce gall formation in plants; chemical, mechanical, and viral triggers have been discussed.

=== Non-human organs and biomolecules ===
Unsolved problems relating to the structure and function of non-human organs, processes and biomolecules include:

- Korarchaeota (archaea). The metabolic processes of this phylum of archaea are so far unclear.
- Glycogen body. The function of this structure in the spinal cord of birds is not known.
- Arthropod head problem. A long-standing zoological dispute concerning the segmental composition of the heads of the various arthropod groups, and how they are evolutionarily related to each other.
- Ovaries of basking sharks. Only the right ovary in female basking sharks appears to function. The reason is unknown.
- Brightly colored bird eggs. It is unknown what evolutionary process would lead birds to having brightly colored eggs given the increased visibility to predators.
- Stegosaur osteoderms/scutes. There is a long-standing debate over whether the primary function of the osteoderms/scutes of stegosaurs is protection from predators, sexual display, species recognition, thermoregulation, or other functions.
- Function of vanadocytes, a type of blood cells found in some tunicates. Vacuoles of vanadocytes are notable for high levels of the metal vanadium and their low pH.
- Metabolism in Henneguya zschokkei, a species of myxozoan. This species of cnidarian was found to lack mitochondria and, therefore, is incapable of aerobic respiration.
- Mitochondria in loriciferans living in anoxic conditions. It is unknown whether members of the phylum Loricifera adapted to life in anoxic conditions in the L'Atalante basin, like Spinoloricus cinziae, have mitochondria.
- Parakaryon. The logistics of how such an organism would arise, function, and persist are unclear, as is whether it is a real creature or just an artifact due to its unusual affinities.

== Artificial life ==
Unsolved problems in artificial life include:

- How does life arise from the non-living?
- What are the potentials and limits of living systems?
- How is life related to mind, machines, and culture?

== See also ==
- Unsolved problems in medicine
- List of unsolved problems in neuroscience
- Biological dark matter
