= Nodding disease =

- Other names: Nodding syndrome
- Map of counties of South Sudan affected by nodding disease in 2011. Several of these are in the Central Equatoria state, in the south of the country near the border with Uganda; Juba on the White Nile is the nation's capital. The red district was already affected in 2001, in yellow districts the disease was prevalent as of 2011 and in green districts there are only sporadic reports.
- Specialty: Infectious disease

Nodding disease, also known as nodding syndrome, is a mentally and physically disabling disease that affects children aged 3 and above, continuing into adulthood. It was first described in 1962 in secluded mountainous regions of Tanzania, with sporadic outbreaks in the decades since in South Sudan, Uganda, and again in Sudan with its largest outbreak from 2016 to present. Since 2019 cases have been identified in the Democratic Republic of the Congo, Central African Republic and Cameroon.

Its cause is unknown, and no cure yet exists.

== Signs and symptoms ==
Children affected by nodding disease experience a complete and permanent stunting of growth. The growth of the brain is also stunted, leading to intellectual disability. The disease is named for the characteristic, pathological nodding seizure, which often begins with the sight of food or dropping temperatures. These seizures are brief and halt after the children stop eating or when they feel warm again. Seizures in nodding disease span a wide range of severity. Neurotoxicologist Peter Spencer, who has investigated the disease, has stated that upon presentation with food, "one or two [children] will start nodding very rapidly in a continuous, pendulous nod. A nearby child may suddenly go into a tonic–clonic seizure, while others will freeze." Severe seizures can cause the child to collapse, causing injury. Sub-clinical seizures have been identified in electroencephalograms, and MRI scans have shown brain atrophy and damage to the hippocampus and glia cells.

It has been found that no seizures occur when affected individuals are given an unfamiliar or non-traditional food, such as chocolate.

== Causes ==
As of 2024 the cause of the disease was not known, but a link has been found between nodding syndrome, infestation by the parasitic worm Onchocerca volvulus prevalent in all outbreak areas, and exposure to black-fly bites which transmit it. A possible explanation involves the formation of antibodies against parasite antigen that are cross-reactive to leiomodin-1 in the central nervous system. O. volvulus, a nematode, is carried by the black fly and causes river blindness. In 2004, most children with nodding disease lived close to the Yei River, a hotbed for river blindness, and 93.7% of those with nodding disease were found to harbour the parasite — a far higher percentage than in children without the disease. A link between river blindness and normal cases of epilepsy, as well as retarded growth, had been proposed previously, although the evidence for this link is inconclusive. Of the connection between the worm and the disease, Scott Dowell, the lead investigator into the syndrome for the US Centers for Disease Control and Prevention (CDC), stated: "We know that [Onchocerca volvulus] is involved in some way, but it is a little puzzling because [the worm] is fairly common in areas that do not have nodding disease". Andrea Winkler, the first author of a 2008 Tanzanian study, has said of the connection: "We could not establish any hint that Onchocerca volvulus is actually going into the brain, but what we cannot exclude is that there is an autoimmune mechanism going on." In the most severely affected region of Uganda, infection with microfilariae in epileptic or nodding children ranged from 70% to 100%.

In 2011 the CDC was investigating a possible connection with wartime chemical exposure, and whether a deficiency in vitamin B_{6} (pyridoxine) could be a cause, noting the seizures of pyridoxine-dependent epilepsy and this common deficiency in those with the disease. Older theories include a 2002 toxicology report that postulated a connection with tainted monkey meat, as well as the eating of agricultural seeds provided by relief agencies that were covered in toxic chemicals.

== Diagnosis ==
Diagnosis is not very advanced and is based on the telltale nodding seizures of the patients. When stunted growth and mental disability are also present, probability of nodding syndrome is high. In the future, neurological scans may also be used in diagnosis.

== Management ==
As of 2024 no cure was known for the disease, so treatment has been directed at symptoms, and has included the use of anticonvulsants used to treat epilepsy such as sodium valproate and phenobarbitol. Anti-malaria drugs have also been administered, to unknown effect. Nutritional deficiencies may also be present.

== Prognosis ==
Nodding syndrome is debilitating both physically and mentally. In 2004, Peter Spencer stated: "It is, by all reports, a progressive disorder and a fatal disorder, perhaps with a duration of about three years or more." Without epilepsy drugs, the condition worsens; seizures can cause accidents and even death. Long-term effects include brain damage, stunted growth and mental impairment. A few children are said to have recovered from the disease, but many have died.

== Epidemiology ==
While the majority of occurrences of the disease known as "nodding syndrome" have been relatively recent, it appears that the condition was first documented in 1962 in southern Tanzania. More recently, nodding syndrome had become most prevalent in South Sudan, where in 2003 approximately 300 cases were found in Mundri alone. By 2009, it had spread across the border to Uganda's Kitgum district, and the Ugandan ministry of health declared that more than 2000 children had the disease. As of the end of 2011, outbreaks were concentrated in Kitgum, Pader and Gulu. More than 1000 cases were diagnosed in the last half of that year.

There were further outbreaks in early 2012, in South Sudan, Uganda, and Tanzania. In the five years to 2024 cases have been identified in the Democratic Republic of the Congo, Central African Republic and Cameroon.

The spread and manifestation of outbreaks may further be exacerbated due to the poor availability of health care in the region.

== See also ==
- List of mystery diseases
