= The Secret History of the Moon =

2020 short film by John Boswell

- Written by: John Boswell
- Produced by: John Boswell
- Narrated by: Sarah T. Stewart
- Edited by: John Boswell
- Music by: John Boswell
- Animation by: John Boswell (several)
- Backgrounds by: John Boswell
- Production company: Amber Mountain Studios
- Distributed by: Amber Mountain Studios
- Release date: April 30, 2020
- Running time: 15 minutes 5 seconds
- Country: United States
- Language: English

The Secret History of the Moon is a 2020 short speculative animated documentary film created by astronomy-themed musician and filmmaker John D. Boswell. It explores the proposed explanations on how the Moon was formed, using rocks collected by Neil Armstrong and Buzz Aldrin during the 1969 Apollo 11 mission. The film was released on Boswell's YouTube channel Melodysheep on April 30.

== Summary ==
After the Apollo 11 mission ended, geochemists discovered that the chemical signatures, specifically the elemental isotopes, of the Earth and the Moon are identical; as well as that volatile elements have been somehow vaporized away. This leads to several proposed explanations on how the Moon might have formed and how it might have become the one as of present date:

- Giant Impact Hypothesis: The Moon formed from the ejecta of a collision between the proto-Earth and a Mars-sized proto-planet, named Theia, approximately 4.5 billion years ago, in the Hadean eon (about 20 to 100 million years after the Solar System coalesced). However, planetary scientist Dr. Sarah T. Stewart later says that the Earth and the Moon are made from the same materials, while the collision would have had the Moon formed almost from Theia's debris. Hence, this theory may not be correct.
- Georeactor Hypothesis: Radioactive elements such as uranium, that could have become very concentrated under Earth's surface due to centrifugal force, formed an "underground" nuclear explosion, resulting in a very huge quantity of rock blasting off of Earth. Materials ejected slowly coalesced into the Moon. Skepticism is also shown, leaning towards uranium and its capability of making such explosion. Although it is not mentioned, the centrifugal force would have had actually a lower intensity than the one necessary to produce such nuclear explosion.
- Synestia Hypothesis: Re-examination of the Giant Impact Hypothesis. The Earth was hit by Theia so hard that it became a torus of liquid-vaporized rock, a synestia. As it was hit, all the gases, including elements that could explain the identical isotopes, were mixed in just a few hours. The Moon grew from the magma rain that condensed from the rock vapor. The Moon secretly orbited the synestia, Earth, for years, before it was revealed as the environment cooled down and shrunk. This theory was approved by Dr. Stewart. Although still unproven, this is the newest theory and can explain more accurately than ever the similarities between the Earth and Moon.

The film then looks at the possibility of the Moon once having liquid water and life of its own, with evidence being lunar volcanism bursting water vapor. It also looks at the possibility of microorganisms arriving from Earth via asteroid impact, and living under Moon waters, although, as the film declared, "if there was ever life on the Moon, it was not to last." But the Moon may have played a fundamental role in the history of life: it may also be possible that life on Earth exists thanks to the Moon at all, due to it stabilizing Earth's tilt, protecting life from extreme swings in climate.

The film then ended with suggestions that humans should go to explore the Moon again to learn more about its "secrets." Quoting the film, "whether we do it or not, the Moon will wait for us, like it always had, since its birth".

After the credits, a text reads, "For Zelda."

== Reception ==
Aeon says that the film is "a stylish, speculative lunar history that might inspire a renewed sense of awe for our closest celestial companion". Digital publication The Awesomer says that it is "captivating", while blogger Clo Willaerts states that it is an "impressive short film about the Moon's amazing backstory".

== Soundtrack ==
The Secret History of the Moon: Original Soundtrack

Soundtrack album by John D. Boswell
- Released: April 30, 2020
- Genre: Electronic
- Length: 17:31
- Producer: John D. Boswell

melodysheep chronology
The Music of Sound (2020)	The Secret History of the Moon: Original Soundtrack (2020)	Life Beyond: Chapter II Original Soundtrack (2020)
- Does not include archive narrations.

All music is composed by John Boswell.

No.	Title	Length
1.	"Written in the Rocks"	3:19
2.	"Theia"	2:18
3.	"Gaia"	2:03
4.	"Georeactor"	3:14
5.	"Synestia"	3:04
6.	"Moon Water"	3:33
Total length:		17:31
