= Glycogen body =

Structure in avians of unknown purpose

Identifiers
- NeuroLex ID: nlx_151880

A glycogen body is an oval structure in the spinal cord of birds that is made of specialized cells that contain large amounts of glycogen. Housed within the synsacrum, the function of this structure is not known, but it does not seem to be related to the normal function of glycogen in animals, which is the storage of energy. Glycogen bodies may also have been present in some non-avian dinosaurs and are possibly the explanation for the structure that was once thought to be a "second brain" in animals such as Stegosaurus.
