= Out There (video game) =

2014 video game

- Developer: Mi-Clos Studio
- Platforms: Android, iOS, Microsoft Windows, Mac OS, Linux, Nintendo Switch
- Release: Android, iOS: WW: February 27, 2014; Nintendo Switch: WW: April 9, 2019
- Genres: Adventure, Roguelike

Out There is an Android and iOS game by French indie developer Mi-Clos Studio, released on February 27, 2014. It was later released on PC, Mac and Linux through Steam. An enhanced version titled Out There: Ω The Alliance was released on the Nintendo Switch on April 9, 2019. It was followed by Out There Chronicles and Out There: Oceans of Time.

== Plot ==
The story begins in the 22nd century. Earth is exhausted of resources and no longer a viable planet for its human civilization, whose unsustainable growth made it impossible for developing society any further. An astronaut is sent to Ganymede, a moon of Jupiter, in order to find viable resources to supply Earth. Onboard of his ship, the Nomad, the astronaut sleeps in cryonics until reaching his destiny. Unfortunately, he wakes up in an unknown location, far away from the Earth.

Through his adventure, the astronaut meets many alien creatures. There are three civilizations that the astronaut interacts with that have a major impact: The Judges/Architects, responsible for the destruction of solar systems, Star Iron, an advanced AI that runs the stations the player can resupply in, and People Death, the original creators of Star Iron and survivors of another species whose home world was destroyed by the Judges/Architects.

The game ending depends on which civilization the player decides to speak to or help. If he speaks to the Judges/Architects, he is only informed of what happened to him and to Earth. If he confronts People Death and defeats them, they will see them as a sort of godly being, and allow him to use their army to ravage worlds. Only if the player helps Star Iron destroy the Judges/Architects enclave, can he use the wormhole of the system where the enclave was located to travel back to 22nd century Earth, and bring new technology and a new hope for Humanity. There is also a fourth ending, added in the "Omega Edition" of the game, in which the player uses one of the Arks left behind by humans who tried to flee Earth to colonize a new planet for Humanity and rebuild civilization anew.

== Gameplay ==
Out There centers around exploration and resource management. The player starts with a ship equipped with some devices, fuel, oxygen, and hull metal, and can mine planets for more resources; a steady supply of them is necessary to continue progressing through the game. Along the way, the player will also discover a variety of aliens in space and planetside, as well as artifacts and abandoned spaceships, which can be stripped of equipment and resources or taken over. The final goal of the game is to travel across a sector of space to a faraway solar system.

== Critical reception ==
Reception

Aggregate score
Aggregator	Score
Metacritic	iOS: 85/100; PC: 75/100; NS: 74/100

Review scores
Publication	Score
Eurogamer	iOS: 8/10
Game Informer	iOS: 7.5/10
GamesRadar+	iOS: 4.5/5
TouchArcade	iOS: 5/5 iOS (Chronicles): 3/5
USgamer	iOS: 4.5/5

The game has a Metacritic score of 85/100 based on 19 critic reviews.

Slide to Play wrote, "Out There is a wonderfully atmospheric resource management game that gets under your skin." TouchArcade said, "It works because Out There gets the threat of death right." GamesRadar+ praised the "melancholy atmosphere" and "challenging resource management", which they said would draw players back repeatedly despite its issues. USgamer described the game as "easy to play but surprisingly deep". They praised its "beautifully crafted atmosphere" and replayability. AppleNApps said that it "offers an involved experience that you can truly get lost in" and is "a must have title". Pocket Gamer said, "A vast, lonely game about space and time and death, Out There is by turns funny, exciting, and fresh."

4Players said that it is poignant, mysterious and deadly. Hyper Magazine deemed it "solidly built and continually compelling". Eurogamer said that speaks of the "human pioneering spirit" and urge to survive, while demonstrating "the fragility of life". Multiplayer.it said the reliance on luck could be frustrating. Digital Spy said "Out There is a game about controlling what you can, and adapting to what you can't, as a new story unfolds with each jump across the stars." Gamezebo said it is "a solidly built game" that they recommended to "anyone looking for a proper adventure game" and those who enjoy luck-based games. Because of the text-based nature, they said it was "suitable for players of all skill levels".

148Apps said it is "quite an interesting interstellar adventure, but the sheer level of randomness might turn off some players". Game Informer said the difficulty "can be infuriating", but players who enjoy the luck aspect of roguelikes will find it a fascinating attempt to combine strategy with storytelling". MacLife said "With atmosphere and story driving the slow-burning adventure, Out There is decidedly light on action and excitement. That said, it's the game's personality and surprises that will keep you pushing deeper into the stars." Gameblog.fr wrote "Out There is some kind of science fiction gamebook, where the difficulty changes depending the end you want to reach. This rogue-like doesn't feature combats, but it is still very interesting. And for this price, you should definitely try it."
