= John D. Boswell =

American musician and filmmaker

- Education: Gonzaga Preparatory School; Western Washington University
- Notable work: Symphony of Science; Timelapse of the Entire Universe; Timelapse of the Future; The Secret History of the Moon

YouTube information
- Channel: melodysheep
- Subscribers: 3.2 million
- Views: 432 million
- Website: www.melodysheep.com

John D. Boswell, known by his YouTube pseudonym melodysheep, is an American electronic musician, filmmaker and YouTuber who creates short epic animated documentary films that explore science and astronomy, notably Symphony of Science (which includes "A Glorious Dawn", a piece of music based on recorded speeches by Carl Sagan and Stephen Hawking), Timelapse of the Entire Universe, and Timelapse of the Future.

Boswell has worked as a producer and composer for PBS and National Geographic, having created Origins: The Journey of Humankind for the latter.
