= Lists of problems =

The following articles contain lists of notable problems. This includes unsolved problems, which may refer to several notable conjectures or open problems in various academic fields:

== Natural sciences and medicine ==
- List of unsolved problems in astronomy
- List of unsolved problems in biology
- List of unsolved problems in chemistry
- List of unsolved problems in geoscience
- List of unsolved problems in medicine
- List of unsolved problems in neuroscience
- List of unsolved problems in physics

== Mathematics ==
- List of unsolved problems in mathematics
- List of undecidable problems
- List of NP-complete problems
- List of PSPACE-complete problems
- List of problems in loop theory and quasigroup theory

== Social sciences, statistics, and information sciences ==
- List of unsolved problems in economics
- List of unsolved problems in fair division
- List of unsolved problems in statistics
- List of unsolved problems in computer science
- List of unsolved problems in information theory

== Other ==
- List of philosophical problems
- List of unsolved deaths

== See also ==
- Cold case
- List of ciphertexts
- List of hypothetical technologies
- List of paradoxes
- Unknowability
