= List of unsolved problems in information theory =

This article lists notable unsolved problems in information theory. These are separated into source coding and channel coding. There are also related unsolved problems in philosophy.

== Channel coding ==
- Capacity of a network: The capacity of a general wireless network is not known. There are some specific cases for which the capacity is known, such as the AWGN channel and fading channel.
- Capacity of the broadcast channel: The capacity of the broadcast channel, or the case in which a single transmitter is sending information to many receivers, is unknown in general, though it is known for several specific cases.
- Capacity of the interference channel (Two User): The capacity of the interference channel, in the case where there are two transmitter and receiver pairs that interfere among each other, is unknown in general. Capacity is known in special cases: strong interference regime, injective-deterministic. Capacity is known in approximate sense or within a range for: injective-semi-deterministic, additive white Gaussian noise with per block power constraint.
- Capacity of the two-way channel: The capacity of the two-way channel (a channel in which information is sent in both directions simultaneously) is unknown. Capacity is known in special cases: for the two-way channel with additive white Gaussian noise, capacity is achieved without using feedback, by independent Gaussian codewords at each terminal. For the additive Gaussian multiway channel with a common output (a generalization to more than two users), the sum-rate capacity is known above a certain SNR threshold, and for all SNR under per-symbol power constraints.
- Capacity of ALOHAnet: The ALOHAnet used a very simple access scheme for which the capacity is still unknown, though it is known in a few special cases.
- Capacity of the queue channel: Under a FIFO policy, whether the feedback capacity of the queue channel is strictly greater than the capacity without feedback is unknown for general service time distributions though it is known that the two quantities are equal when the service time distribution is memoryless.
- Quantum capacity: The capacity of a quantum channel is in general not known.

== Source coding ==
- Lossy distributed source coding: The best way to compress correlated information sources using encoders that do not communicate with each other, preserving each source to within its distortion metric, is not known.
