= Craig Childs =

American writer, naturalist and wilderness explorer

- Born: Craig Leland Childs; April 21, 1967; Tempe, Arizona
- Education: University of Colorado Boulder (BA); Prescott College (MA)
- Occupations: author, naturalist, wilderness explorer
- Years active: 1995–present
- Notable work: Stone Desert (1995); House of Rain (2007); Finders Keepers (2010)
- Spouse: Regan Choi (div.)
- Children: 2

Craig Leland Childs (born April 21, 1967) is an American writer, naturalist, and wilderness explorer primarily known for his writings about the American Southwest.

== Biography ==
=== Early life and education ===
Childs was born in Tempe, Arizona. His parents were James Childs, an insurance agent, and Sharon Carpenter (née Riegel), an artist who made furniture. They divorced when he was three years old, however, and Childs was primarily raised by his mother, whom he described as a "insatiable outdoor traveler." His father, whom Childs described as "a southern New Mexico intellectual redneck," had been a promising runner in his early years, but a torn Achilles tendon in his freshman year at college permanently ended his athletic ambitions.

Childs earned his Bachelor of Arts and graduated magna cum laude from the University of Colorado Boulder in 1990. He later earned his master's degree in desert studies from Prescott College.

During the late 1980s and early 1990s, Childs spent his summers working as a river guide across Arizona, Utah, and Wyoming and spent his winters living in the mountains and desert. He spent seven years living out of his truck in this period.

=== Career ===
Childs's first book Stone Desert was written over the course of the winter of 1994 while he stayed in Canyonlands National Park. The book was initially published by John Fielder's Westcliff Publishers in 1995 when Childs was 28, for which he was paid an advance of $4,000. He has since written over a dozen books and essay collections, including The Secret Knowledge of Water (2000), House of Rain (2007), and Finders Keepers (2010). He is a regular commentator on NPR's Morning Edition and has contributed writings to the Los Angeles Times, Men's Journal, The New York Times, and Outside.

Childs has taught graduate writing courses at the University of Montana, the University of Alaska Anchorage, and the Mountainview MFA at Southern New Hampshire University.

In 2019, his voice was used as a narration in John D. Boswell's flowmotion documentary Timelapse of the Future.

== Reception ==
Childs writing has been praised by literary critics for vividly chronicling the geography and history of the American Southwest. However, he has also been criticized by academics such as the archeologist Brian M. Fagan for misrepresenting or misunderstanding some of scientific data about which he writes.

Childs has received numerous accolades for his work, including the National Outdoor Book Award in 1998 and the Orion Book Award in 2013, and is a three-time recipient of the Sigurd Olson Environmental Institute's Sigurd F. Olson Nature Writing Award (2007, 2012, and 2018).

== Personal life ==
Childs currently lives outside of Norwood, Colorado with his wife Daiva Chesonis. He was married to the artist and photographer Regan Choi, a fellow river guide he met in the early 1990s. The couple had two children, Aspen and Jade, before divorcing in 2015.

== Bibliography ==
- Stone Desert: A Naturalist's Exploration of Canyonlands National Park (1995)
- Crossing Paths: Uncommon Encounters With Animals in the Wild (1997)
- Grand Canyon: Time Below the Rim (1999)
- The Secret Knowledge of Water (2000)
- Soul of Nowhere (2002)
- The Desert Cries: A Season of Flash Floods in a Dry Land (2002)
- The Way Out: A True Story of Survival (2005)
- House of Rain: Tracking a Vanished Civilization Across the American Southwest (2007)
- The Animal Dialogues: Uncommon Encounters in the Wild (2007)
- Finders Keepers: A Tale of Archaeological Plunder and Obsession (2010)
- Apocalyptic Planet: Field Guide to the Future of the Earth (2012)
- Atlas of a Lost World: Travels in Ice Age America (2018)
- Virga & Bone: Essays from Dry Places (2019)
- Tracing Time: Seasons of Rock Art on the Colorado Plateau (2022)
