= Photo-erosion =

Dispersion of star layers

Photo-erosion is the dispersion of the outer layers of a prestellar core by the ionizing radiation of a nearby O-type or B-type star.

This erosion prevents the accretion of these outer layers around the protostar at the centre of the core; and this, in turn, prevents the protostar from becoming a fully fledged star. The protostar instead becomes a brown dwarf or planetary-mass object.
