= PKS 1302−102 =

Quasar

Observation data (Epoch J2000.0)
- Constellation: Virgo
- Right ascension: 13^{h} 05^{m} 33.01498^{s}
- Declination: −10° 33′ 19.4266″
- Redshift: 0.2784
- Distance: 3.5×10^{9} ly (1.1 Gpc)
- Type: FSRS, FSRQ, FSQ, QSO, E4
- Apparent magnitude (V): 14.9

Other designations
- PG 1302−102, PG 1302−103, ICRF J130533.0−103319, PKS 1302−102, PKS 1302−103, PKS J1305−1033, PKS B1302−102, QSO J1305−1033, QSO B1302−1017, PGC 4662778

PKS 1302−102 is a quasar in the constellation Virgo, located at a distance of approximately 1.1 Gpc (around 3.5 billion light-years). It has an apparent magnitude of about 14.9 mag in the V band with a redshift of 0.2784. The quasar is hosted by a bright elliptical galaxy, with two neighboring companions at distances of 3 kpc and 6 kpc. The light curve of PKS 1302−102 appears to be sinusoidal with an amplitude of 0.14 mag and a period of 1,884 ± 88 days, which suggests evidence of a supermassive black hole binary.

== Possible black hole binary ==
PKS 1302−102 was selected from the Catalina Real-Time Transient Survey as one of 20 quasars with apparent periodic variations in the light curve. Of these quasars, PKS 1302−102 appeared to be the best candidate in terms of sinusoidal behavior and other selection criteria, such as data coverage of more than 1.5 cycles in the measured period. One plausible interpretation of the apparent periodic behavior is the possibility of two supermassive black holes (SMBH) orbiting each other with a separation of approximately 0.1 pc in the final stages of a 3.3 billion year old galaxy merger. If this turns out to be the case, it would make PKS 1302−102 an important object of study to various areas of research, including gravitational wave studies and the unsolved final parsec problem in a merger of black holes.

Other explanations, of lesser likelihood, to the observed sinusoidal periodicity include a hot spot on the inner part of the black hole's accretion disk and the possibility of a warped accretion disk which partially eclipses in the orbit around a single SMBH. However, it also remains possible that the periodic behavior in PKS 1302−102 is indeed just a random occurrence in the light curve of an ordinary quasar, as spurious nearly-periodic variations can occur over limited time periods as part of stochastic quasar variability. Further observations of the quasar could either promote true periodicity or rule out a binary interpretation, especially if the measured light curve randomly diverges from the sinusoidal model.
