= Symphony of Science =

Music project by John D. Boswell

The official series logo.

The Symphony of Science is a music project created by Washington-based electronic musician John D. Boswell.

On November 9, 2009, Third Man Records released a 7-inch single of "A Glorious Dawn" for the 75th anniversary of the birth of Carl Sagan. There were a total of 5 different vinyl records produced, including a limited edition 8-inch single distributed only by the Third Man Records pop-up store in Austin, Texas, during SXSW 2010.

== Music and video ==
=== A Glorious Dawn ===
"A Glorious Dawn"

Single by Carl Sagan and Stephen Hawking
- A-side: "A Glorious Dawn"
- B-side: "(Etched Design)"
- Released: November 9, 2009
- Length: 3:34
- Label: Third Man Records

Boswell's first video in the Symphony of Science series is 3 minutes, 34 seconds long. The video had been viewed 800,000 times.

=== A Wave of Reason ===
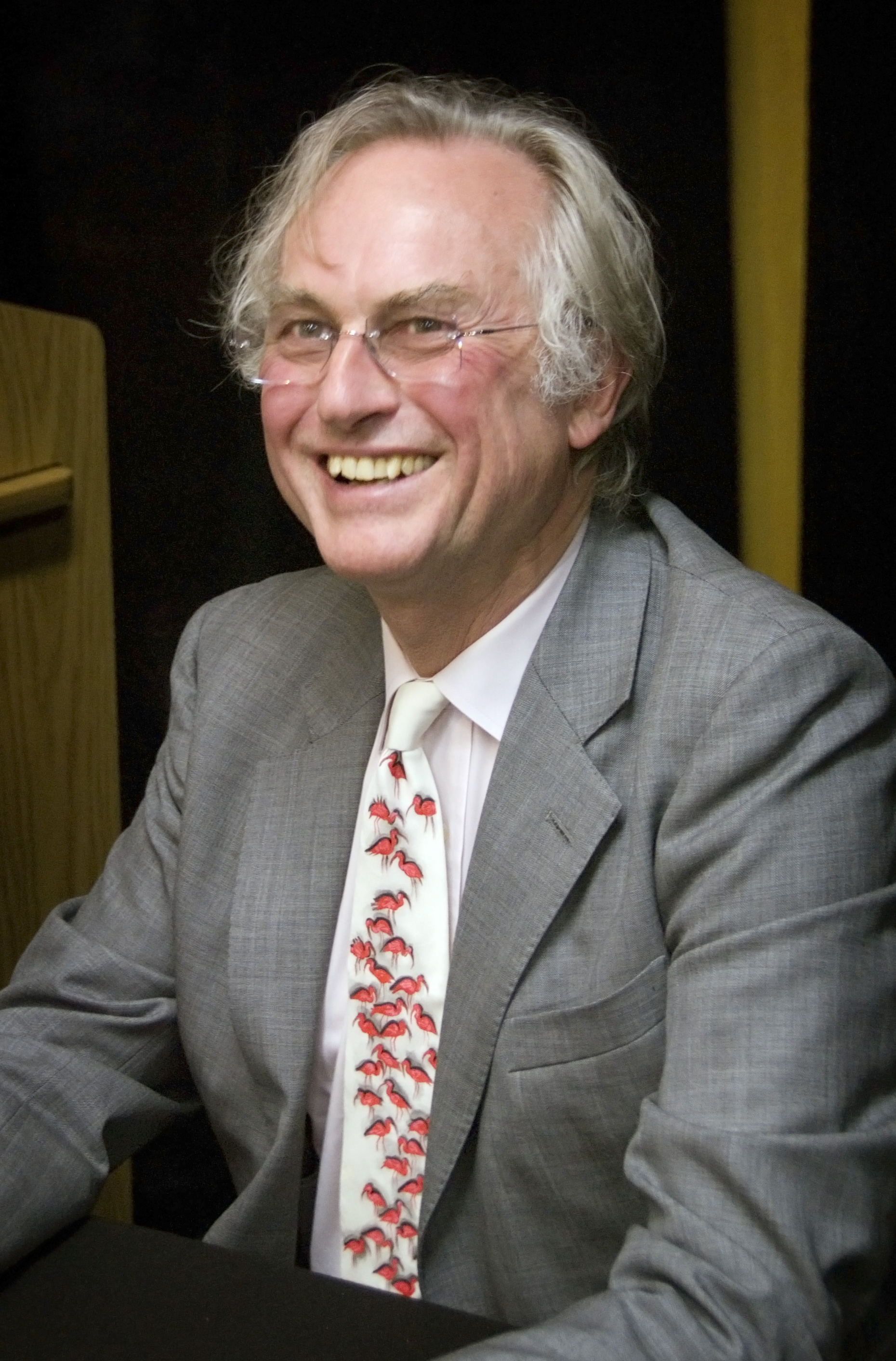
Richard Dawkins.

The seventh installment, released on November 23, 2010, is about reasoning and skepticism. It is intended to promote scientific reasoning and skepticism in the face of growing amounts of pseudoscientific pursuits, such as astrology and homeopathy, and also to "promote the scientific worldview as equally enlightening as religion."

== Reviews ==
Musician Carrie Brownstein found the idea behind Symphony of Science "quite beautiful and amazing in both its sincerity and aims". She also enjoyed the "hip-hop stylings" of the camera angle on Bill Nye while he is moving his hands around and expressing himself on "We Are All Connected". Writer Nick Sagan, son of Carl Sagan, was impressed with "A Glorious Dawn", giving it a favorable review and stamp of approval. Sagan writes, "John Boswell over at Colorpulse Music is a mad genius, sampling both Cosmos and Stephen Hawking's Universe series into three minutes and thirty-four seconds of pure, concentrated awesomeness... Love it, love it, love it. Dad would have loved it, too."

Columnist Franklin Harris argues that Boswell's videos show that science can arouse the minds of artists just as much as religion and mythology have in the past. Harris calls the videos "art for the Information Age, inspired by science".

New Music Transmission, a podcast who featured Symphony of Science in 2009, gave "A Glorious Dawn" positive reviews and called Symphony of Science as "A thinking man's Pogo", referring to the Australian electro artist who was featured 2 weeks before.

Christopher Jion, of Dirgefunk Records, has praised Symphony of Science saying,

"When I first heard John Boswell's "A Glorious Dawn," it brought tears to my eyes, it was life-changing. The original idea was to release a compilation of space and science-themed tracks from a handful of artists I like (of course, including some Symphony Of Science tracks). But as John kept releasing new Symphony Of Science material it became very obvious that it deserved its own album, and, as it's an ongoing project, perhaps there will be more volumes to follow. This CD is a gift from me to anyone listening who has a passion for music and science. It was paid for out of my own pocket with nothing expected in return. It's free to anyone who'll appreciate its ideas and messages. Dirgefunk Records does not exist for profit Its sole existence is to release material for the enjoyment of myself and likeminded persons. So, enjoy. (April, 2012)"

Jion released a limited edition music CD compilation in 2012 featuring 15 Symphony of Science tracks, listed below:

1. A Glorious Dawn 3:33
2. We Are All Connected 4:12
3. Our Place In The Cosmos 4:20
4. The Unbroken Thread 3:59
5. The Poetry Of Reality 3:05
6. The Case For Mars 4:03
7. A Wave Of Reason 3:42
8. The Big Beginning 3:00
9. Ode To The Brain 3:41
10. Children Of Africa (The Story Of Us) 4:00
11. The Quantum World 3:30
12. Onward To The Edge 3:37
13. The Greatest Show On Earth 3:23
14. The World Of The Dinosaurs 3:10
15. The Cosmic Dance (Mindwalk Remix) 3:08
