= List of unsolved problems in geoscience =

This list provides references to notable unsolved problems in geoscience.

== Early Earth and the Solar System ==
- Was there ever a collision of Earth with the hypothesized planet of Theia, which gave birth to the Moon? There is compelling evidence, such as measures of a shorter duration of the Earth's rotation and lunar month in the past, that suggests the possibility that Earth's Moon was much closer to Earth during the early stages of Solar System formation.
- What is the long-term heat balance of Earth? How did its internal temperature decay since it formed by accretion of chondrites? How abundant are radiogenic elements in the interior? Did a "faint young Sun" ever warm a "snowball Earth"?

== Physical geography ==
- Can the now widely available topographic data be used to derive past tectonic and climatic conditions (in the multi-million year scale)? Do we know enough about the erosion and transport processes? Does the stochasticity of meteorological and tectonic events reflect in the landscape? How much has life contributed to shape the Earth's surface?
- Can classical geomorphological concepts such as peneplanation or retrogressive erosion be quantitatively understood? Old mountain ranges such as the Appalachian or the Urals seem to retain relief for >10^{8} years, while subglacial fluvial valleys under Antarctica are preserved under moving ice of kilometric thickness since the Neogene. What controls the time-scale of topographic decay?
- What are the erosion and transport laws governing the evolution of the Earth's Surface? Rivers transport sediment particles that are at the same time the tools for erosion but also the shield protecting the bedrock. How important is this double role of sediment for the evolution of landscapes?

== Atmospheric science ==
- What controls the dynamics of storm tracks?
- Why do we have the number of tropical cyclones that we do?
- Mechanisms that cause oscillations in equatorial climate remain under intense study. The El Nino Southern Oscillation (ENSO) of the equatorial Pacific Ocean temperature is difficult to predict more than a few months in advance. The Quasi-Biennial Oscillation (QBO) of the equatorial stratospheric winds is somewhat regular at ~28 months but the cause has been heavily debated. Are these stochastic, chaotic, or deterministically forced behaviors?
- What are skyquakes?
- What causes Hessdalen lights?

== Oceanography ==
- What is the true recovery timescale for deep-ocean acidification once (if) atmospheric CO2 is drawn down?

== Geology ==
- The 'space problem': How are granite magma chambers emplaced in the crust? What are the structures and locations of the magmatic systems that might cause supervolcanoes? What are the viscosities and densities of the magma chambers and the details of magma migration?
- What are the non-uniformities and rheological details of the mantle? What is the structure of the 660 km discontinuity and its relation to the correct model of the polar drift?
- What is the precise nature of chemical heterogeneity associated with the Gutenberg discontinuity?
- What are the light alloying elements in the Earth's outer core and how are they distributed? What are the heterogeneities of the core and their dynamical significance?
- Does the internal mantle structure provide the resonance for the Chandler wobble of the Earth's axis or is it some other external mechanism? No available motions seem to be coherent drivers for the wobble period of 433 days.
