= Out There: Oceans of Time =

2022 video game

- Developer: Mi-Clos Studio
- Publisher: Modern Wolf
- Platform: Windows
- Release: WW: May 26, 2022
- Genre: Adventure
- Mode: Single-player

Out There: Oceans of Time is a 2022 adventure game developed by Mi-Clos Studio and published by Modern Wolf. It includes elements of survival games and role-playing games. Players attempt to survive while tracking an alien warlord in their spaceship. It is a sequel to Out There.

== Gameplay ==
Players control Commander Nyx, a character from Out There: Chronicles. Nyx is pursuing an alien warlord named Archon, who escaped from captivity. Players must manage the crew, scavenge for resources, explore planets, and engage in diplomacy with aliens. Collecting one resource requires putting another at risk, such as requiring fuel to collect oxygen. Sending expeditions to planets similarly risks fuel for the possibility of finding useful resources or villages. To talk to aliens, players must first learn their language through trial and error. Saving one's progress requires collecting a resource.

== Development ==
Developer Mi-Clos Studio is based in France. Mi-Clos' founder, Michaël Peiffert, said the Out There series has mirrored his personal circumstances. When he was no longer a sole developer and had to manage a team, the mechanics of the Out There series likewise changed. Initially, Oceans of Time was meant to have roguelike elements like Out There. As the story grew in importance, they found these mechanics untenable and rebalanced Oceans of Time as a role-playing game, which they felt made it more approachable.

Modern Wolf released Out There: Oceans of Time for Windows on May 26, 2022.

== Reception ==
Out There: Oceans of Time received mixed reviews on Metacritic. Although NME enjoyed its creativity, they criticized its difficulty and what they felt was a poor tutorial, both of which they said made enjoying the game difficult. NME and CD-Action concluded that Oceans of Time was too split between the punishing difficulty of a roguelike game and a story-based adventure game to recommend. Eurogamer Italia recommended it to fans of the previous Out There games, who will be used to the punishing difficulty and survival elements.
