= Wastebasket diagnosis =

Type of medical diagnosis

A wastebasket diagnosis or trashcan diagnosis is a vague diagnosis given to a patient or to medical records department for essentially non-medical reasons. It may be given when the patient has an obvious but unidentifiable medical problem, when a doctor wants to reassure an anxious patient about the doctor's belief in the existence of reported symptoms, when a patient pressures a doctor for a label, or when a doctor wants to facilitate bureaucratic approval of treatment. It differs from a diagnosis of exclusion in that a wastebasket diagnosis is a diagnostic label of doubtful value, whereas a diagnosis of exclusion is characterized by the diagnosis being arrived at indirectly (through the process of excluding all other plausible causes). Unlike a vague wastebasket diagnosis, the diagnostic label arrived at through a process of exclusion may be precise, accurate, and helpful.

The term may also be used pejoratively to describe disputed medical conditions. In this sense, the term implies that the condition has not been properly classified. It can carry a connotation that the prognosis of individuals with the condition are more heterogeneous than would be associated with a more precisely defined clinical entry. As diagnostic tools improve, it is possible for these kinds of wastebasket diagnoses to be properly defined and reclassified as clinical diagnoses.

Wastebasket diagnoses are often made by medical specialists, and referred back to primary care physicians for long term management.

== Examples ==
Common wastebasket diagnoses include:

- Chronic fatigue syndrome (when applied to fatigue of unknown origin)
- Fibromyalgia (when applied to pain of unknown origin)
- Subclinical hypothyroidism
- Seronegative rheumatoid arthritis
- Irritable bowel syndrome
- Chronic pain syndromes
- Interstitial cystitis ("bladder pain syndrome")
- Costochondritis (when applied to chest pain of an unknown source)
- Gastroesophageal reflux (when applied to chest pain of an unknown source)
- Shin splints, which is a label given to multiple separate conditions

Reactive hypoglycemia has been used as a trashcan diagnosis for people who complain about normal physiological reactions to being hungry. In these cases, the labels are offered when nothing more serious can be identified. Bronchitis may be used as a trashcan diagnosis to label sick children.

A diagnosis like fibromyalgia is not invariably a wastebasket diagnosis; many "trashcan" labels can be applied specifically and appropriately, and they are considered wastebasket diagnoses only when they are applied to pain or other common symptoms whose origin or cause cannot be determined.

Different specialists provide different wastebasket labels to the same sets of symptoms. For example, in response to a person with chronic pain but no detected medical pathology, a rheumatologist might label the symptoms fibromyalgia, a specialist in physical medicine and rehabilitation might diagnose regional pain, and an orthopedic surgeon will call it chronic pain syndrome. Other specialties similarly focus on their specialty, producing the wastebasket labels from their own fields.

Some diagnoses are being used as trashcan diagnoses in response to unintentional incentives. For example, government-run schools in the United States get additional funding for providing services to students with autism spectrum disorders, so some children with atypical behavior patterns are labeled as having ASD so the school can more easily obtain funding for special education services.

== History ==
Medicine around the world has a long history of using and abusing the concept of trashcan diagnoses. The common ones include "rectifying the humors", marthambles, neurasthenia and other such garbled Latin-sounding names which were made up to impress the patient's family.

== Management ==
The medical community is often split on the best approach to managing a wastebasket diagnosis. The biggest challenge for a physician is maintaining their interest and desire to see the patient through their illness. Antidepressants and cognitive therapies are commonly employed, speaking to the possible emotional basis that underpins these diagnoses or the physician's effort to psychopathologize the patient whose disorder the physician can not identify.

== See also ==
- Diagnosis of exclusion, the diagnosis given to a patient when all other plausible options have been ruled out
- Bright's disease
