= List of unsolved problems in neuroscience =

The following is a list of notable unsolved problems in neuroscience. A problem is considered unsolved if no answer is known or if there is significant disagreement among experts about a proposed solution.

== Consciousness ==
- Consciousness:
  - How can consciousness be defined?
  - What is the neural basis of subjective experience, cognition, wakefulness, alertness, arousal, and attention?
    - Binding problem: How exactly is it that objects, background, and abstract or emotional features are combined into a single experience?
    - What is the neural basis of self?
  - Quantum mind: Do quantum mechanical phenomena, such as entanglement and superposition, play an important part in the brain's function and can it explain critical aspects of consciousness?
  - Is there a "hard problem of consciousness"?
    - If so, how is it solved?
    - Vertiginous question: Why is it that a specific subject of experience is "live" from a given perspective?
  - What, if anything, is the function of consciousness?
    - Problem of mental causation: How exactly do mental states cause intentional actions to happen?
  - What is the nature and mechanism behind near-death experiences?
    - How can death be defined? Can consciousness exist after death?
    - If consciousness is generated by brain activity, then how do some patients with physically deteriorated brains suddenly gain a brief moment of restored consciousness prior to death, a phenomenon known as terminal lucidity?
  - What beings are conscious?
    - Animal consciousness: What animals or other lifeforms have conscious experience?
    - Are philosophical zombies possible?
    - How might it be possible to test whether a being has qualia or not?
- Problem of representation: How exactly does the mind function (or how does the brain interpret and represent information about the world)?
  - Bayesian mind: Does the mind make sense of the world by constantly trying to make predictions according to the rules of Bayesian probability?
  - Computational theory of mind: Is the mind a symbol manipulation system, operating on a model of computation, similar to a computer?
  - Connectionism: Can the mind be explained by mathematical models known as artificial neural networks?
  - Embodied cognition: Is the cognition of an organism affected by the organism's entire body (rather than just simply its brain), including its interactions with the environment?
  - Extended mind thesis: Does the mind not only exist in the brain, but also functions in the outside world by using physical objects as mental processes? Or just as prosthetic limbs can become part of the body, can handwritten notes become part of the mind?
  - Mind-body dualism: Is the mind distinct from the body?
  - Modularity of mind: Is the mind composed of distinct modules, each evolved to solve a specific evolutionary problem from the past?
  - Dynamical neuroscience: Is the mind a dynamical system?

== Sensation, perception and movement ==
- Perception:
  - How does the brain transfer sensory information into coherent, private percepts?
  - What are the rules by which perception is organized?
  - What are the features/objects that constitute our perceptual experience of internal and external events?
  - How are the senses integrated?
  - What is the relationship between subjective experience and the physical world?

== Learning and memory ==
- Learning and memory:
  - Where do our memories get stored and how are they retrieved again?
  - How can learning be improved?
  - What is the difference between explicit and implicit memories?
  - What molecule is responsible for synaptic tagging?
- Neuroplasticity: How plastic is the mature brain?
- Cognition and decisions:
  - How and where does the brain evaluate reward value and effort (cost) to modulate behavior?
  - How does previous experience alter perception and behavior?
  - What are the genetic and environmental contributions to brain function?

== Language ==
- Language:
  - How is it implemented neurally?
  - What is the basis of semantic meaning?
- Language acquisition:
  - Controversy: infant language acquisition/first-language acquisition. How are infants able to learn language? One line of debate is between two points of view: that of psychological nativism, i.e., the language ability is somehow "hardwired" in the human brain, and usage based theories of language, according to which language emerges through to brain's interaction with environment and activated by general dispositions for social interaction and communication, abstract symbolic thought and pattern recognition and inference.
  - Is the human ability to use syntax based on innate mental structures or is syntactic speech the function of intelligence and interaction with other humans? The question is closely related to those of language emergence and acquisition.
  - Is there a language acquisition device: How localized is language in the brain? Is there a particular area in the brain responsible for the development of language abilities or is it only partially localized?
  - What fundamental reasons explain why ultimate attainment in second-language acquisition is typically some way short of the native speaker's ability, with learners varying widely in performance?
  - What are the optimal ways to achieve successful second-language acquisition?
  - Animals and language: How much human language can animals be taught to use? How much of animal communication can be said to have the same properties as human language (e.g. compositionality of bird calls as syntax)?
  - What role does linguistic intuition play, how is it formed and how does it function? Is it closely linked to exposure to a unique set of different experiences and their contexts throughout one's personal life?
- Linguistic relativity: What are the relations between grammatical patterns and cognitive habits of speakers of different languages? Does language use train or habituate speakers to certain cognitive habits that differ between speakers of different languages? Are effects of linguistic relativity caused by grammar structures or by cultural differences that underlie differences in language use?

== Mind-body connection ==
- Free will, particularly the neuroscience of free will.
  - Problem of mental causation
- Sleep:
  - What is the biological function of sleep?
  - Why do we dream?
  - What are the underlying brain mechanisms?
  - What is its relation to anesthesia?

== Computational neuroscience ==
- Computational theory of mind: What are the limits of understanding thinking as a form of computing?
- Computational neuroscience:
  - How important is the precise timing of action potentials for information processing in the neocortex?
  - Is there a canonical computation performed by cortical columns?
  - How is information in the brain processed by the collective dynamics of large neuronal circuits?
  - What level of simplification is suitable for a description of information processing in the brain?
  - What is the neural code?
- How do general anesthetics work?
- The emergence and evolution of intelligence: What are the laws and mechanisms - of new idea emergence (insight, creativity synthesis, intuition, decision-making, eureka); development (evolution) of an individual mind in the ontogenesis, etc.?

== See also ==
- List of unsolved problems in mathematics
- List of unsolved problems in physics
