= Pre-stellar core =

Phase in the formation of low-mass stars

Pre-stellar cores are the nurseries of new stars, and are an early phase in the formation of low-mass stars, before gravitational collapse produces a central protostar. The spatial distribution of pre-stellar cores shows the history of their formation, and their sensitivity to the physics controlling their creation.

Most of our Galaxy's star formation takes place in clusters and groups within large molecular clouds. These clouds are often turbulent, showing supersonic line widths and complex magnetic fields which play crucial roles in cloud physics. The properties of pre-stellar cores within molecular clouds aid understanding of the large-scale physical processes dictating star formation.

== Composition ==
Pre-stellar cores are hundreds of thousands of solar masses of dust and gas collapsing due to the influence of gravity. The density is much greater than the average interstellar density having around one thousand atoms per cubic centimeter as opposed to the one atom per cubic centimeter in the interstellar medium.

== See also ==
- Jeans instability
