= Binary black hole =

System consisting of two black holes in close orbit around each other

Computer simulation of the black hole binary system GW150914 as if seen by a nearby observer during its final inspiral, merge, and ringdown. The star field behind the black holes is being heavily distorted and appears to rotate and move, due to extreme gravitational lensing, as space-time itself is distorted and dragged around by the rotating black holes.

A binary black hole (BBH), or black hole binary, is an astronomical object consisting of two black holes in close orbit around each other. Like black holes themselves, binary black hole systems are classified as either stellar-mass—involving remnants of high-mass binary star systems or formed by dynamic processes and mutual capture—or supermassive, black hole systems believed to arise from galactic mergers.

The existence of stellar-mass binary black holes was directly confirmed by gravitational wave observation in September 2015. Supermassive binary black hole candidates have been proposed based on indirect evidence, but await observational confirmation.

== History ==
For many years, proving the existence of black holes was challenging because, by definition, they allow no visible light or other electromagnetic radiation to escape and therefore be emitted for remote detection. However, it was known from Einstein that if a pair of black holes were to merge, an immense amount of energy would be given off as gravitational wave radiation, with distinctive waveforms that could be calculated using general relativity. Accordingly, during the late 20th and early 21st century, binary black holes became of great interest scientifically as a potential source of gravitational waves—beyond just proving such waves themselves to exist.

Binary black hole mergers would be one of the strongest known sources of gravitational waves in the universe, and thus offered a good chance of directly detecting such waves. As the orbiting black holes give off these waves, the orbit decays, and the orbital period decreases. This lengthy inspiral stage persists until the black holes finally merge when they are close enough. In the final fraction of a second the black holes can reach extremely high velocity, and the gravitational wave amplitude reaches its peak. Once merged, the single hole settles down to a stable form, a stage called ringdown, where aspherical distortions in its shape are dissipated as additional gravitational wave radiation.

The existence of stellar-mass binary black holes (and gravitational waves themselves) was finally confirmed when the Laser Interferometer Gravitational-Wave Observatory (LIGO) detected GW150914 (detected September 2015, announced February 2016), a distinctive gravitational wave signature of two merging stellar-mass black holes of around 30 solar masses each, occurring about 1.3 billion light-years away. In its final 20 ms of spiraling inward and merging, GW150914 released around 3 solar masses as gravitational energy, peaking at a rate of 3.6×10^{49} W—more than the combined power of all light radiated by all the stars in the observable universe put together.

== Occurrence ==
Stellar-mass binary black holes have been demonstrated to exist, by the first detection of a black-hole merger event GW150914 by LIGO.

In this visualization, a binary system containing two supermassive black holes and their accretion disks is initially viewed from above. After about 25 seconds, the camera dips closer to the orbital plane to reveal the lensing effects produced by their immense gravity. The different colors assigned to the accretion disks make it easier to visualize the complex optical distortions that would be seen by an outside observer.

Supermassive black-hole (SMBH) binaries are believed to form during galaxy mergers. Some likely candidates for binary black holes are galaxies with double cores still far apart. An example active double nucleus is NGC 6240. Much closer black-hole binaries are likely in single-core galaxies with double emission lines. Examples include SDSS J104807.74+005543.5 and EGSD2 J142033.66 525917.5. Other galactic nuclei have periodic emissions suggesting large objects orbiting a central black hole, for example, OJ287 a likely supermassive binary with an orbital period of 12 years.

Measurements of the peculiar velocity of the mobile SMBH in the galaxy J0437+2456 indicate that it is a promising candidate for hosting either a recoiling or binary SMBH, or an ongoing galaxy merger.

The quasar PKS 1302-102 appears to have a binary black hole with an orbital period of 1900 days.

== Final parsec problem ==
When two galaxies collide, the supermassive black holes at their centers are very unlikely to hit head-on and would most likely shoot past each other on hyperbolic trajectories, unless some mechanism brings them together. The most important mechanism is dynamical friction, which transfers kinetic energy from the black holes to nearby matter. As a black hole passes a star, the gravitational slingshot accelerates the star while decelerating the black hole.

This slows the black holes enough that they form a bound binary system, and further dynamical friction steals orbital energy from the pair until they are orbiting within a few parsecs of each other. However, this process also ejects matter from the orbital path, and as the orbits shrink, the volume of space the black holes pass through reduces, until there is so little matter remaining that it could not cause a merger within the age of the universe.

Gravitational waves can cause significant loss of orbital energy, but not until the separation shrinks to a much smaller value, roughly 0.01–0.001 parsec.

Nonetheless, supermassive black holes appear to have merged, and what appears to be a pair in this intermediate range has been observed in PKS 1302-102. The question of how this happens is the "final parsec problem".

A number of solutions to the final parsec problem have been proposed. Most involve mechanisms to bring additional matter, either stars or gas, close enough to the binary pair to extract energy from the binary and cause it to shrink. If enough stars pass close by to the orbiting pair, their gravitational ejection can bring the two black holes together in an astronomically plausible time. Another possibility is circumbinary accretion. Dark matter is also being considered, although it appears that self-interacting dark matter is required to avoid the same problem of it all being ejected before the merger occurs.

One mechanism that is known to work, albeit infrequently, is a third supermassive black hole from a second galactic collision. While it is possible that one of the three is ejected, their large masses make it more likely that one is not ejected, but instead the three have repeated interactions. The resultant chaotic orbits allow two additional energy loss mechanisms:

1. the black holes orbit through a substantially larger volume of the galaxy, interacting with (and losing energy to) a much greater amount of matter, and
2. the orbits can become highly eccentric, allowing energy loss by gravitational radiation at the point of closest approach.

== Lifecycle ==
=== Inspiral ===
The first stage of the life of a binary black hole is the inspiral, a gradually shrinking orbit. The first stages of the inspiral take a very long time, as the gravitational waves emitted are very weak when the black holes are distant from each other. In addition to the orbit shrinking due to the emission of gravitational waves, extra angular momentum may be lost due to interactions with other matter present, such as other stars.

As the black holes' orbit shrinks, the speed increases, and gravitational wave emission increases. When the black holes are close the gravitational waves cause the orbit to shrink rapidly.

The last stable orbit or innermost stable circular orbit (ISCO) is the innermost complete orbit before the transition from inspiral to merger.

=== Merger ===
This is followed by a plunging orbit, in which the two black holes meet, followed by the merger. Gravitational wave emission peaks at this time.

=== Ringdown ===
Immediately following the merger, the newly formed black hole is highly distorted and unstable. It undergoes a relaxation process called the ringdown, during which the black hole "rings" and emits gravitational waves. These oscillations are similar to the fading tone of a struck bell and are described as damped oscillations, or quasinormal modes. During the ringdown, the amplitude of the gravitational waves rapidly decreases, corresponding to the black hole becoming increasingly stable and symmetric. This part of the signal is essential to confirm that the final object is a Kerr black hole, as predicted by general relativity.

== Observation ==
The first observation of stellar-mass binary black holes merging, GW150914, was performed by the LIGO detector. As observed from Earth, a pair of black holes with estimated masses around 36 and 29 times that of the Sun spun into each other and merged to form an approximately 62-solar-mass black hole on 14 September 2015, at 09:50 UTC. Three solar masses were converted to gravitational radiation in the final fraction of a second, with a peak power 3.6×10^{49} W (200 solar masses per second), which is 50 times the total output power of all the stars in the observable universe. The merger took place 440+160
−180 megaparsecs from Earth, between 600 million and 1.8 billion years ago. The observed signal is consistent with the predictions of numerical relativity simulations.

== Dynamics modelling ==
Some simplified algebraic models can be used for the case where the black holes are far apart, during the inspiral stage, and also to solve for the final ringdown.

Post-Newtonian approximations can be used for the inspiral. These approximate the general-relativity field equations adding extra terms to equations in Newtonian gravity. Orders used in these calculations may be termed 2PN (second-order post-Newtonian) 2.5PN or 3PN (third-order post-Newtonian). Effective-one-body (EOB) approximation solves the dynamics of the binary black-hole system by transforming the equations to those of a single object. This is especially useful where mass ratios are large, such as a stellar-mass black hole merging with a galactic-core black hole, but can also be used for equal-mass systems.

For the ringdown, black-hole perturbation theory can be used. The final Kerr black hole is distorted, and the spectrum of frequencies it produces can be calculated.

Description of the entire evolution, including merger, requires solving the full equations of general relativity. This can be done in numerical relativity simulations. Numerical relativity models space-time and simulates its change over time. In these calculations it is important to have enough fine detail close into the black holes, and yet have enough volume to determine the gravitation radiation that propagates to infinity. In order to reduce the number of points such that the numerical problem is tractable in a reasonable time, special coordinate systems can be used, such as Boyer–Lindquist coordinates or fish-eye coordinates.

Numerical-relativity techniques steadily improved from the initial attempts in the 1960s and 1970s. Long-term simulations of orbiting black holes, however, were not possible until three groups independently developed groundbreaking new methods to model the inspiral, merger, and ringdown of binary black holes in 2005.

In the full calculations of an entire merger, several of the above methods can be used together. It is then important to fit the different pieces of the model that were worked out using different algorithms. The Lazarus Project linked the parts on a spacelike hypersurface at the time of the merger.

Results from the calculations can include the binding energy. In a stable orbit the binding energy is a local minimum relative to parameter perturbation. At the innermost stable circular orbit the local minimum becomes an inflection point.

The gravitational waveform produced is important for observation prediction and confirmation. When inspiralling reaches the strong zone of the gravitational field, the waves scatter within the zone producing what is called the post-Newtonian tail (PN tail).

In the ringdown phase of a Kerr black hole, frame-dragging produces a gravitation wave with the horizon frequency. In contrast, the Schwarzschild black-hole ringdown looks like the scattered wave from the late inspiral, but with no direct wave.

The radiation reaction force can be calculated by Padé resummation of gravitational wave flux. A technique to establish the radiation is the Cauchy-characteristic extraction technique CCE, which gives a close estimate of the flux at infinity, without having to calculate at larger and larger finite distances.

The final mass of the resultant black hole depends on the definition of mass in general relativity. The Bondi mass M_{B} is calculated from the Bondi–Sach mass-loss formula, $\frac{dM_B}{dU} = -f(U)$, with f(U) being the gravitational wave flux at retarded time U. f is a surface integral of the news function at null infinity varied by solid angle. The Arnowitt–Deser–Misner (ADM) energy, or ADM mass, is the mass as measured at infinite distance and includes all the gravitational radiation emitted: $M_\text{ADM} = M_\text{B}(U) + \int_{-\infty}^U F(V) \,dV$.

Angular momentum is also lost in the gravitational radiation. This is primarily in the z axis of the initial orbit. It is calculated by integrating the product of the multipolar metric waveform with the news function complement over retarded time.

== Shape ==
One of the problems to solve is the shape or topology of the event horizon during a black-hole merger.

In numerical models, test geodesics are inserted to see whether they encounter an event horizon. As two black holes approach each other, a "duckbill" shape protrudes from each of the two event horizons towards the other one. This protrusion extends longer and narrower until it meets the protrusion from the other black hole. At this point in time the event horizon has a very narrow X-shape at the meeting point. The protrusions are drawn out into a thin thread. The meeting point expands to a roughly cylindrical connection called a bridge.

Simulations as of 2011 had not produced any event horizons with toroidal topology (ring-shaped). Some researchers suggested that it would be possible if, for example, several black holes in the same nearly circular orbit coalesce.

== Black-hole merger recoil ==
An unexpected result can occur with binary black holes that merge, in that the gravitational waves carry momentum, and the merging black-hole pair accelerates, seemingly violating Newton's third law. The center of gravity can add over 1000 km/s of kick velocity. The greatest kick velocities (approaching 5000 km/s) occur for equal-mass and equal-spin-magnitude black-hole binaries, when the spins directions are optimally oriented to be counter-aligned, parallel to the orbital plane or nearly aligned with the orbital angular momentum. This is enough to escape large galaxies. With more likely orientations, a smaller effect takes place, perhaps only a few hundred kilometers per second. This sort of speed can eject merging binary black holes from globular clusters, thus preventing the formation of massive black holes in globular-cluster cores. This, in turn, reduces the chances of subsequent mergers, and thus the chance of detecting gravitational waves. For non-spinning black holes a maximum recoil velocity of 175 km/s occurs for masses in the ratio of five to one. When spins are aligned in the orbital plane, a recoil of 5000 km/s is possible with two identical black holes. Parameters that may be of interest include the point at which the black holes merge, the mass ratio that produces maximum kick, and how much mass/energy is radiated via gravitational waves. In a head-on collision this fraction is calculated at 0.002, or 0.2%. One of the best candidates of the recoiled supermassive black holes is CXO J101527.2+625911.

== See also ==
- List of most massive black holes
