= Corona Australis in Chinese astronomy =

According to traditional Chinese uranography, the modern constellation Corona Australis is located within the northern quadrant of the sky, which is symbolized as The Black Tortoise of the North (北方玄武, Běi Fāng Xuán Wǔ)

The name of the Western constellation in modern Chinese is 南冕座 (nán miǎn zuò), meaning "the southern crown constellation".

== Stars ==
The map of Chinese constellation in constellation Corona Australis area consists of :

Four Symbols	Mansion (Chinese name)	Romanization	Translation	Asterisms (Chinese name)	Romanization	Translation	Western star name	Proper Name	Chinese star name	Romanization	Translation
The Black Tortoise of the North (北方玄武)	斗	Dǒu	Dipper	鱉	Biē	River Turtle					
The Black Tortoise of the North (北方玄武)	斗	Dǒu	Dipper	鱉	Biē	River Turtle	η^{1}CrA		鱉二	Biēèr	2nd star
The Black Tortoise of the North (北方玄武)	斗	Dǒu	Dipper	鱉	Biē	River Turtle	ζ CrA		鱉三	Biēsān	3rd star
The Black Tortoise of the North (北方玄武)	斗	Dǒu	Dipper	鱉	Biē	River Turtle	δ CrA	Qedty	鱉四	Biēsì	4th star
The Black Tortoise of the North (北方玄武)	斗	Dǒu	Dipper	鱉	Biē	River Turtle	β CrA	Alqubba	鱉五	Biēwǔ	5th star
The Black Tortoise of the North (北方玄武)	斗	Dǒu	Dipper	鱉	Biē	River Turtle	α CrA	Meridiana	鱉六	Biēliù	6th star
The Black Tortoise of the North (北方玄武)	斗	Dǒu	Dipper	鱉	Biē	River Turtle	γ CrA		鱉七	Biēqī	7th star
The Black Tortoise of the North (北方玄武)	斗	Dǒu	Dipper	鱉	Biē	River Turtle	ε CrA		鰲八	Biēbā	8th star
The Black Tortoise of the North (北方玄武)	斗	Dǒu	Dipper	鱉	Biē	River Turtle	V686 CrA		鳖九	Biējiǔ	9th star
The Black Tortoise of the North (北方玄武)	斗	Dǒu	Dipper	鱉	Biē	River Turtle	κ^{2} CrA		鱉十	Biēshí	10th star
The Black Tortoise of the North (北方玄武)	斗	Dǒu	Dipper	鱉	Biē	River Turtle	θ CrA	Bie	鱉十一	Biēshíyī	11th star

== See also ==
- Traditional Chinese star names
- Chinese constellations
