= Alpha Coronae Australis =

Star in the constellation Corona Australis

α Coronae Australis
- Location of α Coronae Australis (circled)

Observation data Epoch J2000 Equinox ICRS
- Constellation: Corona Australis
- Right ascension: 19^{h} 09^{m} 28.34097^{s}
- Declination: −37° 54′ 16.1022″
- Apparent magnitude (V): 4.09±0.01

Characteristics
- Evolutionary stage: main sequence
- Spectral type: A2V
- U−B color index: +0.06
- B−V color index: +0.04

Astrometry
Radial velocity (R_{v})	−18.40±1.78 km/s
Proper motion (μ)	RA: +84.87 mas/yr Dec.: −95.99 mas/yr
Parallax (π)	26.02±0.25 mas
Distance	125 ± 1 ly (38.4 ± 0.4 pc)
Absolute magnitude (M_{V})	1.11

Details
Mass	2.57 M_{☉}
Radius	2.21 R_{☉}
Luminosity	31 L_{☉}
Surface gravity (log g)	4.08 cgs
Temperature	9,916±337 K
Rotational velocity (v sin i)	195 km/s
Age	254 Myr

Other designations
- Meridiana, α CrA, Alf CrA, CD−38°13350, FK5 718, GC 26360, HD 178253, HIP 94114, HR 7254, SAO 210990, IRAS 19060-3759, 2MASS J19092834-3754157

Database references
SIMBAD	data

Alpha Coronae Australis is the brightest star in the constellation of Corona Australis. It has the official name Meridiana, pronounced /məˌrɪdiˈænə/; Alpha Coronae Australis is its Bayer designation. It is located about 125 light-years from Earth.

== Nomenclature ==
α Coronae Australis (Latinised to Alpha Coronae Australis) is the star's Bayer designation, abbreviated Alpha CrA or α CrA.

It is the only star in the constellation with a traditional proper name, Alphekka Meridiana (Latin for 'Alphekka South'), after Alphecca, the brightest star in the constellation Corona Borealis. The name Alphecca or Alphekka is Arabic, short for نير الفكّة nayyir al-fakka "the bright (star) of the broken (ring of stars)". In 2016, the IAU organized a Working Group on Star Names (WGSN) to catalog and standardize proper names for stars. The WGSN approved the name Meridiana for this star on 5 September 2017 and it is now so included in the List of IAU-approved Star Names.

In Chinese, 鱉 (Biē), meaning River Turtle, refers to an asterism consisting of Alpha Coronae Australis, Alpha Telescopii, Eta^{1} Coronae Australis, Zeta Coronae Australis, Delta Coronae Australis, Beta Coronae Australis, Gamma Coronae Australis, Epsilon Coronae Australis, HD 175362, Kappa^{2} Coronae Australis and Theta Coronae Australis. Consequently, the Chinese name for Alpha Coronae Australis itself is 鱉六 (Biēliù, English: the Sixth Star of River Turtle).

== Properties ==
Alpha Coronae Australis belongs to the spectral class A2Va, making it an A-type star like Vega. Like the latter, it has excess infrared radiation, which indicates it may be ringed by a disk of dust. It has an apparent magnitude of +4.10. The star's mass and radius are estimated at 2.3 times the Sun's mass and radius. With an effective temperature of roughly 9,100 K, the star radiates a total luminosity of about 31 times the Sun's. This star is roughly 254 million years old. A rapidly rotating star, it spins at almost 200 km per second at the equator, making a complete revolution in approximately 14 hours, close to its breakup velocity.

== See also ==
- Lists of stars in the constellation Corona Australis
- Class A stars
- Vega
- Circumstellar disc
