= Eta Coronae Australis =

The Bayer designation η Coronae Australis (Eta Coronae Australis) is shared by two stars, in the constellation Corona Australis:

- η^{1} Coronae Australis, HR 7062, HD 173715
- η^{2} Coronae Australis, HR 7068, HD 173861
