= Coronet Cluster =

Star in the constellation Corona Australis

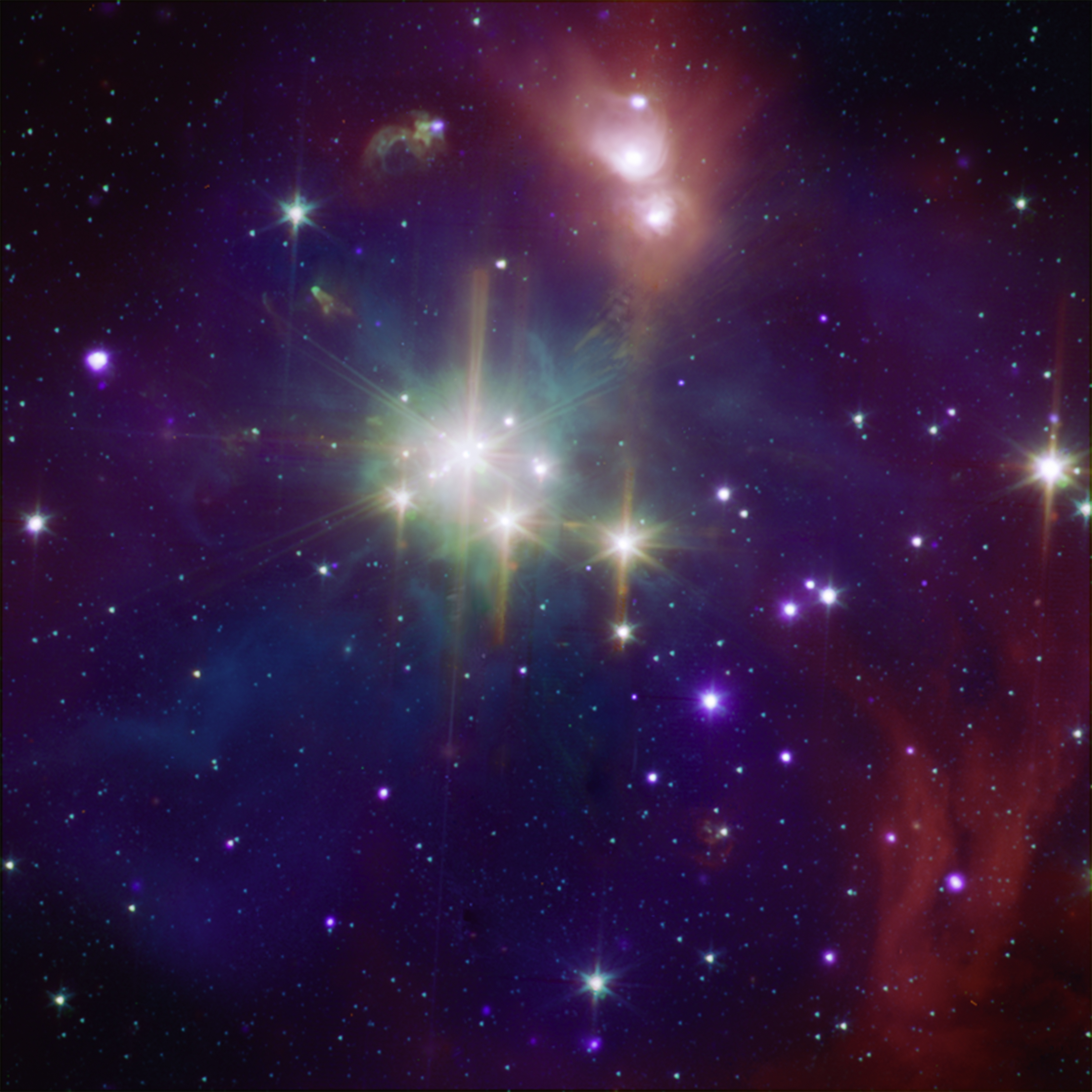
- The Coronet Cluster, R CrA is the central dominantly bright star, with reflection nebulae NGC 6726/NGC 6727 lit by TY CrA and HD 176386 to upper right and parts of IC 4812 at the lower right.

Observation data (J2000.0 epoch)
- Right ascension: 19^{h} 1^{m} 54^{s}
- Declination: −36° 57.2′
- Distance: 420–550 ly (130–170 pc)
- Apparent magnitude (V): 8
- Apparent dimensions (V): 26 arcmin

Physical characteristics
- Mass: unknown M_{☉}
- Radius: 2.1 light years
- Estimated age: 0.5–2 million years
- relative scarcity of circumstellar discs
- Other designations: R CRA, G359.93-17.85 by BDB2003 catalog

Associations
- Constellation: Corona Australis

The Coronet Cluster, also known as the R CrA cluster after its best-known member, is a small open cluster located about 170 parsecs away in the southern constellation Corona Australis, isolated at the edge of the Gould Belt. It is 3.5 times closer to Earth than the Orion Nebula Cluster. The cluster's center is composed of mostly young stars. The variable T Coronae Australis is also a member, located just one arcminute from R CrA.
