= Kappa Coronae Australis =

The Bayer designation κ Coronae Australis (Kappa Coronae Australis) is shared by two stars in the constellation Corona Australis:

- Kappa^{1} Coronae Australis, HR 6952
- Kappa^{2} Coronae Australis, HR 6953

It was found to be a double star by English astronomer John Herschel in 1836. The pair have an angular separation of 21.4′ along a position angle of 359°.
