= V686 Coronae Australis =

Alpha2 CVn variable; Corona Australis

- Location of V686 CrA (circled)

Observation data Epoch J2000.0 Equinox ICRS
- Constellation: Corona Australis
- Right ascension: 18^{h} 56^{m} 40.48593^{s}
- Declination: −37° 20′ 35.7013″
- Apparent magnitude (V): 5.25 to 5.41

Characteristics
- Evolutionary stage: main sequence star
- Spectral type: B3V
- U−B color index: −0.70
- B−V color index: −0.15
- Variable type: α^{2} CVn

Astrometry
Radial velocity (R_{v})	1.3±0.8 km/s
Proper motion (μ)	RA: +8.747 mas/yr Dec.: −25.654 mas/yr
Parallax (π)	6.8427±0.1921 mas
Distance	480 ± 10 ly (146 ± 4 pc)
Absolute magnitude (M_{V})	−0.24
Absolute bolometric magnitude (M_{bol})	−1.9

Details
Mass	4.73±0.21 M_{☉}
Radius	3.52±0.18 R_{☉}
Luminosity	504^{+42}_{−39} L_{☉}
Surface gravity (log g)	3.97 cgs
Temperature	16,482^{+501}_{−486} K
Metallicity [Fe/H]	+1.13 dex
Rotational velocity (v sin i)	45.4±5.1 km/s
Age	63 Myr

Other designations
- 31 G. Coronae Australis, V686 CrA, CD−37°12982, CPD−37°8417, GC 25973, HD 175362, HIP 92989, HR 7129, SAO 210734

Database references
SIMBAD	data

V686 Coronae Australis (HD 175362; HR 7129; V686 CrA) is a solitary, bluish-white-hued variable star located in the southern constellation Corona Australis. It has an apparent magnitude that ranges between 5.25 and 5.41, which makes it faintly visible to the naked eye. Gaia DR3 parallax measurements imply a distance of 480 light years and it is slowly receding with a heliocentric radial velocity of 1.3 km/s. At its current distance V686 CrA's average brightness is diminished by 0.35 magnitudes due to extinction from interstellar dust and it has an absolute visual magnitude of −0.24.

V686 CrA has been known to be variable since 1974. The discovery paper lists it as a helium variable with a period of 3.71 days. Earlier sources give it ordinary spectral classes such as B7.5 V, B8 IV. and B9 III:. In 1976, V686 CrA was found to have a large magnetic field ranging from −5,000 gauss to 7,000 gauss. Borra et al. (1983) gave a value of −6,500–4,800 gauss. A catalogue of chemically peculiar stars gives a spectral class of B6 He wk. Si, indicating it is a helium-weak star. It has also been classified as a mercury-manganese star.

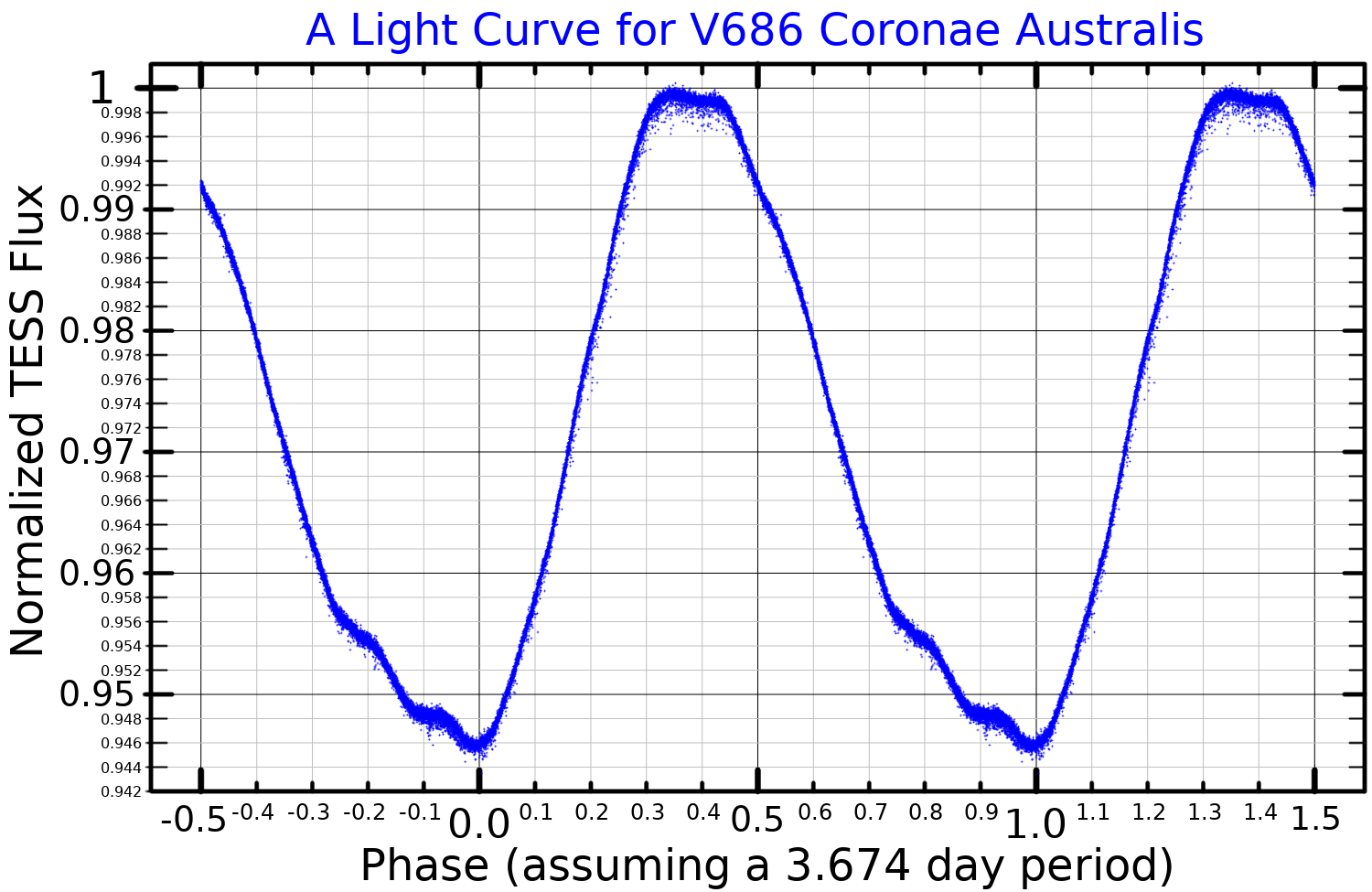
A light curve for V686 Coronae Australis, plotted from TESS data

V686 CrA is an α^{2} Canum Venaticorum variable that ranges from 5.25 to 5.41 within 3.674 days. It has been proposed that the rotation period of the star, and hence the true variability period, is 7.34 days, with two near-identical minima in the light curve. It is a member of the Scorpius-Centaurus association and the Local Association.

The accepted stellar classification for V686 CrA is B3V, indicating that it is B-type main sequence star. It has 4.73 times the mass of the Sun and 3.52 times the Sun's radius. It radiates 504 times the luminosity of the Sun from its photosphere at an effective temperature of 16,482 K V686 has an unusually high metallicity of [Fe/H] = +1.13, which is over 10 times that of the sun. This only accounts for the spectrum of the star and not its entire composition. Like most chemically peculiar stars it spins rather slowly, having a projected rotational velocity of 45.4 km/s. Based on analysis of its surface magnetic fields, V686 CrA is estimated to be 63 million years old, although other sources give a much younger age: for example, 7.9 million years having completed only 0.9% of its main sequence lifetime.
