= S Coronae Australis =

Variable star in the constellation Corona Australis

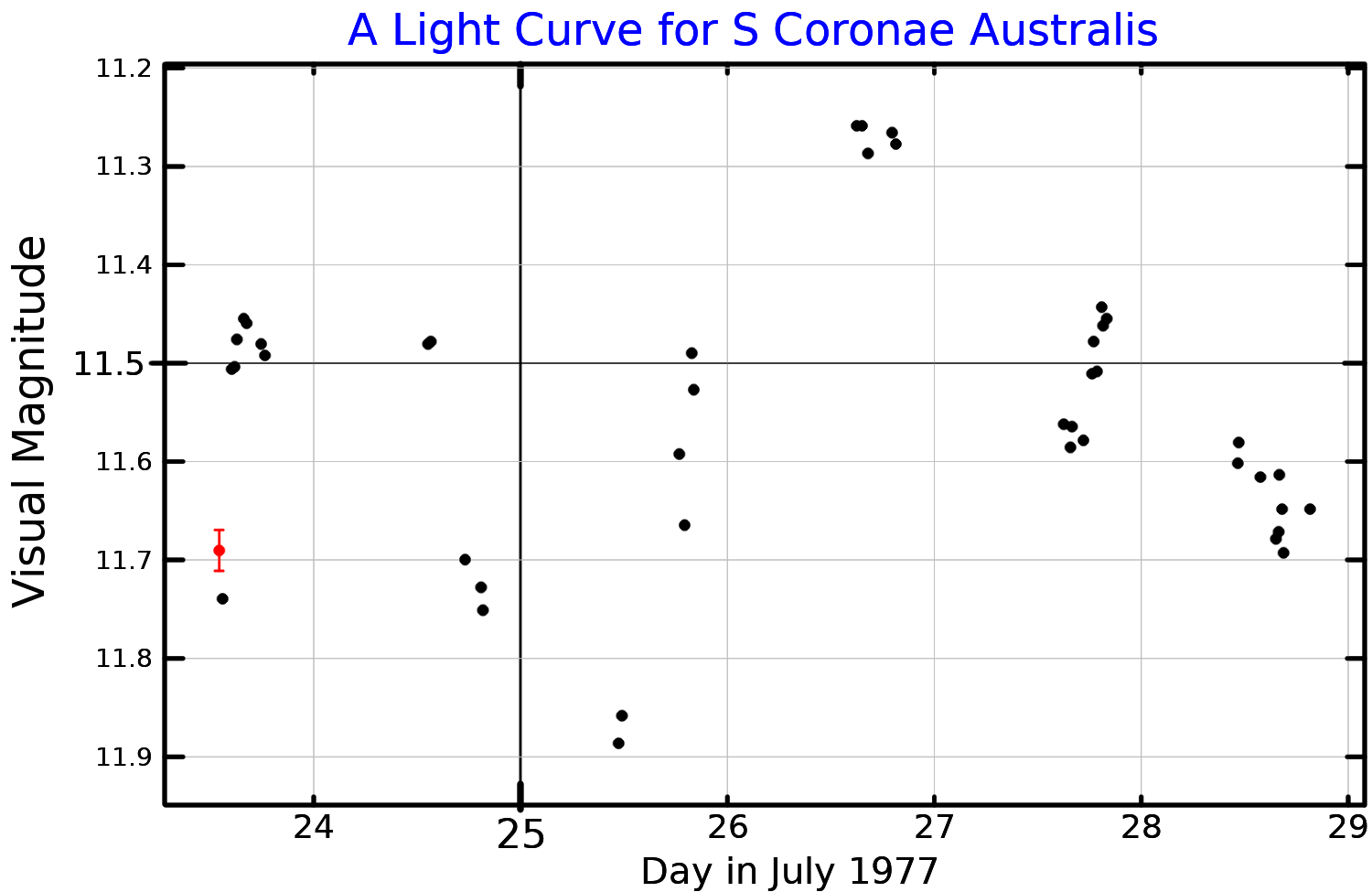
- A visual band light curve for S Coronae Australis, adapted from Mundt (1979). The error bar shown on the left-most point applies to all points.

Observation data Epoch J2000.0 Equinox J2000.0 (ICRS)
- Constellation: Corona Australis
- Right ascension: 19^{h} 01^{m} 08.59709^{s}
- Declination: −36° 57′ 19.8950″
- Apparent magnitude (V): 10.49 - 13.20

Characteristics
- Spectral type: G0Ve + K0Ve
- Variable type: T Tau

Astrometry

A
Radial velocity (R_{v})	0.0 km/s
Proper motion (μ)	RA: +7.054 mas/yr Dec.: −26.511 mas/yr
Parallax (π)	6.2291±0.0683 mas
Distance	524 ± 6 ly (161 ± 2 pc)

B
Radial velocity (R_{v})	+6.0 km/s
Proper motion (μ)	RA: +2.477 mas/yr Dec.: −28.079 mas/yr
Parallax (π)	6.7857±0.0745 mas
Distance	481 ± 5 ly (147 ± 2 pc)

Details

A
Mass	0.8 M_{☉}
Radius	2.3 R_{☉}
Luminosity	1.7 L_{☉}
Surface gravity (log g)	3.6 cgs
Temperature	4,300 K
Rotation	7.3 days
Rotational velocity (v sin i)	10 km/s

B
Mass	0.6 M_{☉}
Luminosity	0.76 L_{☉}
Temperature	3,800 K

Other designations
- S CrA, S Coronae Australis, HH 82

Database references
SIMBAD	data

S Coronae Australis (S CrA), is a young binary star system estimated to be around 2 million years old located in the constellation Corona Australis. It is composed of a G-type main sequence star that is about as luminous as and just over twice as massive as the Sun, and a smaller K-type main sequence star that has around 50-60% of the Sun's luminosity and 1.3 times its mass. Both stars are T Tauri stars and both show evidence of having circumstellar disks. The system is around 140 parsecs distant.

Johann Friedrich Julius Schmidt discovered that the star is a variable star, in 1866. It appeared with its variable star designation in Annie Jump Cannon's 1907 work Second Catalogue of Variable Stars.
