= NGC 6727 =

Reflection nebula in the constellation Corona Australis

Reflection nebula
- emission nebula
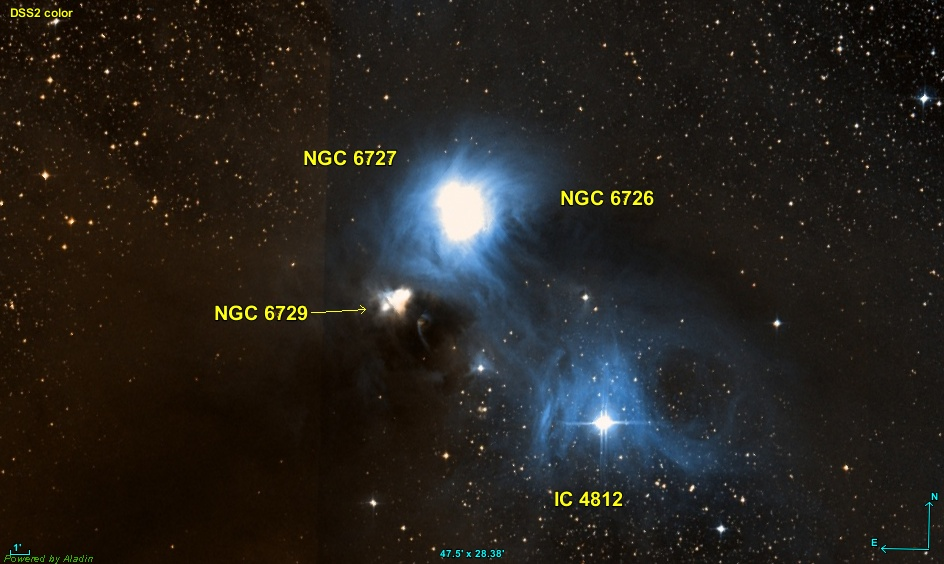
- Image showing NGC 6727

Observation data: J2000 epoch
- Right ascension: 19^{h} 01^{m} 42.27^{s}
- Declination: −36° 52′ 34.467″
- Constellation: Corona Australis
- Designations: IRAS 18583-3657

NGC 6727 is a reflection nebula located in the constellation Corona Australis, forming part of the Corona Australis Molecular Cloud, a prominent star-forming region approximately 500 light-years away from Earth. It is associated with other nebulae in the region, including NGC 6726, NGC 6729, and IC 4812, and is known for its distinctive appearance resembling an angry baboon, earning it the nickname Rampaging Baboon Nebula. The nebula is one of the closest stellar nurseries to the Solar System and is an active site of star formation.

NGC 6727 was cataloged by John Louis Emil Dreyer in the New General Catalogue (NGC) in 1888, based on observations by John Herschel and other astronomers.
