= IC 1297 =

Planetary nebula in the constellation Corona Australis

Emission nebula
- Planetary nebula
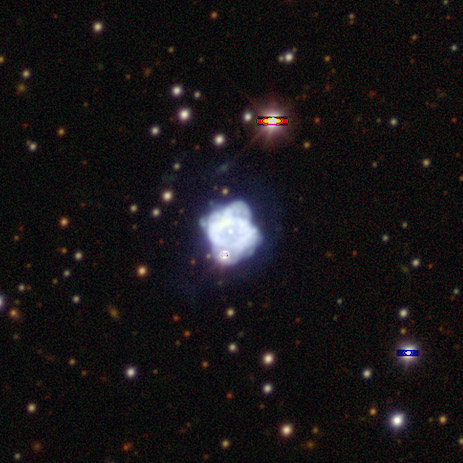
- An image of IC 1297

Observation data: J2000 epoch
- Right ascension: 19^{h} 17^{m} 23.4475188000^{s}
- Declination: −39° 36′ 46.253665872″
- Distance: 16007.755 ly (4908 pc)
- Apparent magnitude (V): 10.7
- Constellation: Corona Australis

Physical characteristics
- Radius: 0.27 ly
- Designations: ESO 99-1, IRAS 15064-6429, IC 1297, AN 18.1907, PN Sa 2-386

IC 1297 (also known as Gaia DR3 6714803311390242048) is a small planetary nebula in the constellation Corona Australis. It was initially discovered by Scottish astronomer Williamina Fleming in 1894. IC 1297 is situated south of the celestial equator so it is more easily visible from the southern hemisphere. Given its visual magnitude of 10.7, IC 1297 is visible with the help of a telescope having an aperture of 6 inches (150mm) or more. The object is located approximately 16,007.76 light years (4908pc) away from the Earth, and is moving away from the Sun at a radial velocity of +19.0 km/s.

== Physical characteristics ==
A paper from 2004 classified the central star of the planetary nebula as a hot Wolf–Rayet type star, with spectral type [WC3/4] or [WO3], indicating strong carbon and oxygen emission lines typical of very evolved stars. Its proper motion has been measured as −1.672 mas/yr in right ascension and −5.191 mas/yr in declination in the 2020 Gaia EDR3 catalog, corresponding to a tangential motion across the sky.

== Gallery ==
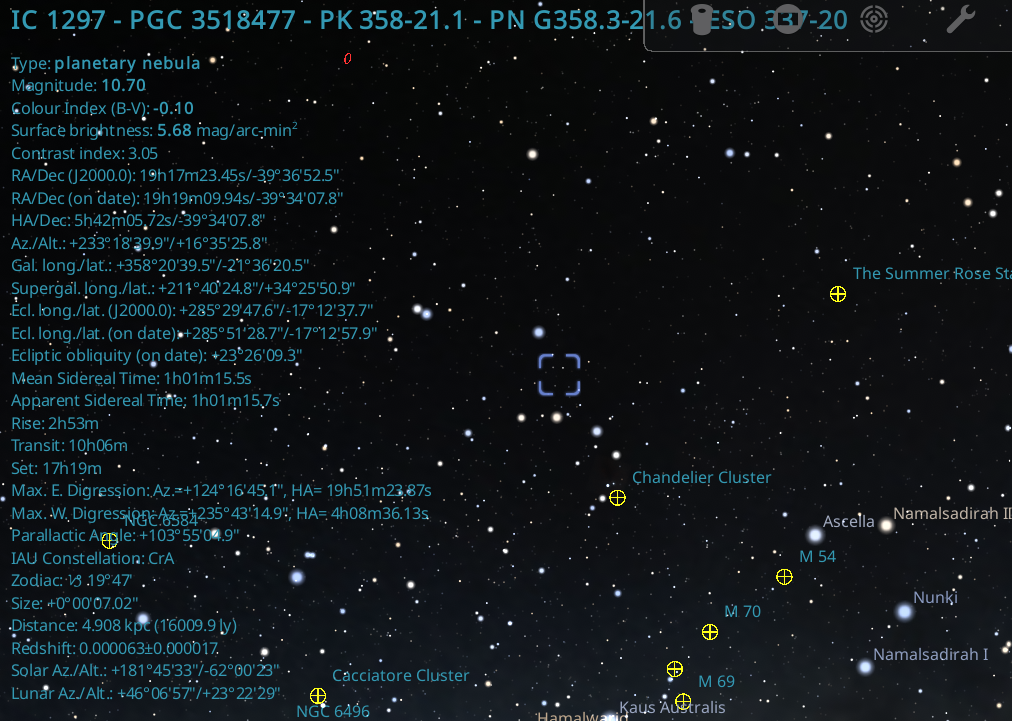
Location of IC 1297 in the sky (in the blue square, using the Stellarium software)
