= Mu Coronae Australis =

Star in the constellation Corona Australis

- Location of Mu CrA (circled)

Observation data Epoch J2000.0 Equinox J2000.0 (ICRS)
- Constellation: Corona Australis
- Right ascension: 18^{h} 47^{m} 44.61759^{s}
- Declination: −40° 24′ 22.1955″
- Apparent magnitude (V): 5.22±0.01

Characteristics
- Spectral type: G5/6 III
- B−V color index: +0.78

Astrometry
Radial velocity (R_{v})	−18.2±0.8 km/s
Proper motion (μ)	RA: +23.690 mas/yr Dec.: −18.373 mas/yr
Parallax (π)	8.4545±0.0993 mas
Distance	386 ± 5 ly (118 ± 1 pc)
Absolute magnitude (M_{V})	−0.22

Details
Mass	3.07±0.11 M_{☉}
Radius	11.4±0.3 R_{☉}
Luminosity	104±5 L_{☉}
Surface gravity (log g)	3.15±0.08 cgs
Temperature	5,448±27 K
Metallicity [Fe/H]	−0.14±0.03 dex
Rotational velocity (v sin i)	7.7±1 km/s
Age	361±66 Myr

Other designations
- μ CrA, 24 G. Coronae Australis, CD−40°12807, CPD−40°8648, FK5 3492, GC 25722, HD 173540, HIP 92226, HR 7050, SAO 229285

Database references
SIMBAD	data

Mu Coronae Australis is a solitary yellow-hued star located in the southern constellation Corona Australis. Its name is a Bayer designation that is Latinized from μ Coronae Australis, and abbreviated Mu CrA or μ CrA. This star has an apparent magnitude of 5.22, making it faintly visible to the naked eye. Gaia DR3 parallax measurements put it 386 light-years (118 pc) away and is currently approaching the Solar System with a heliocentric radial velocity of −18.2 km/s. At its current distance, Mu CrA's brightness is diminished by 0.31 magnitudes due to interstellar dust. It has an absolute magnitude of −0.22.

Mu CrA has a stellar classification of G5/6 III, indicating that it is an evolved G-type star with the characteristics of a G5 and G6 giant star. At an age of 365 million years, the star has exhausted the supply of hydrogen at its core and has expanded to 11.4 times the radius of the Sun. At present it has 3.07 times the mass of the Sun and radiates 104 times the luminosity of the Sun from its enlarged photosphere at an effective temperature of 5,448 K. Mu CrA is slightly metal deficient and spins modestly with a projected rotational velocity of 7.7 km/s.
