= R Coronae Australis =

Star in the constellation Corona Australis

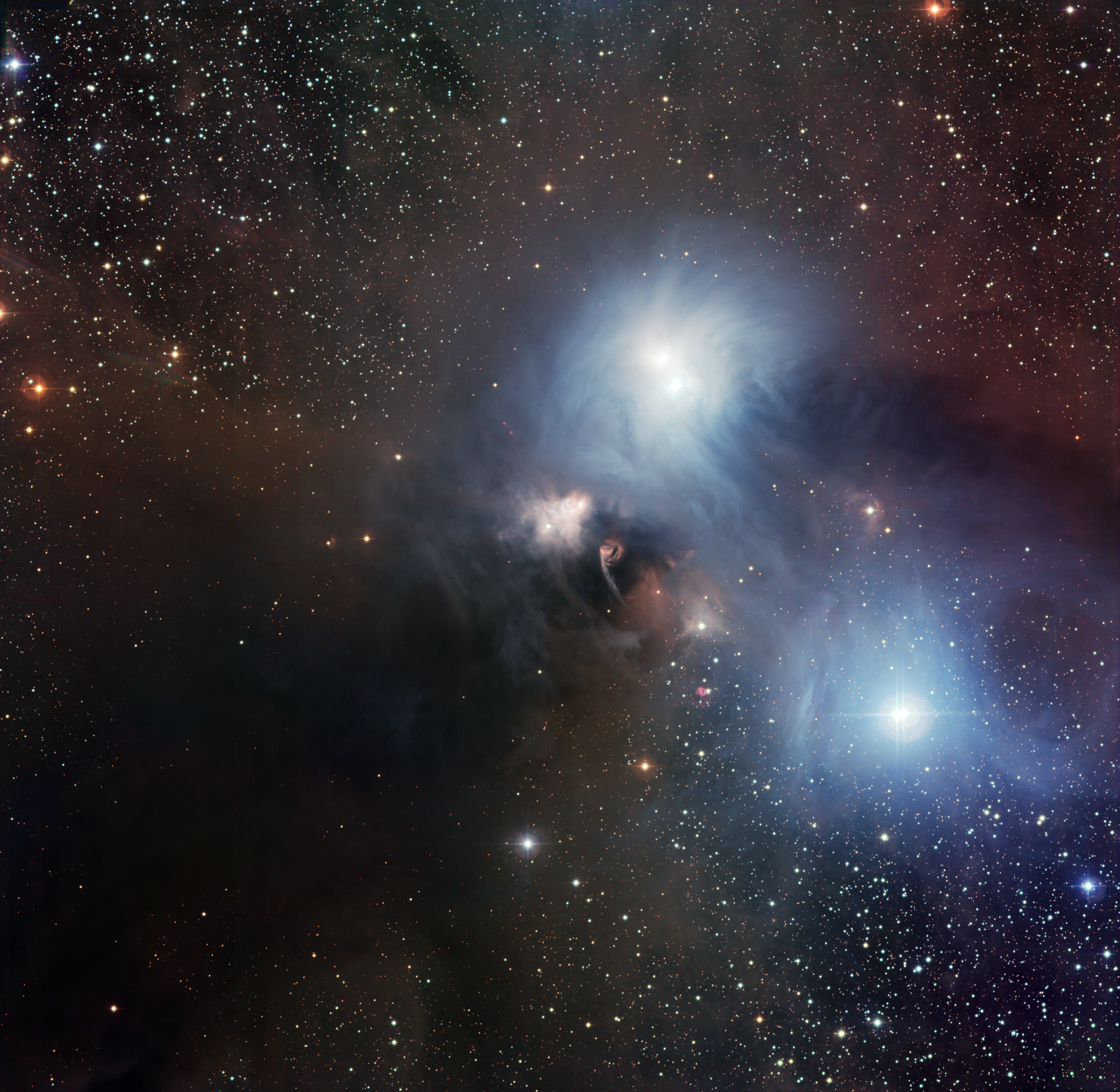
- A colour photo of the R Coronae Australis region in the southern Milky Way.

Observation data Epoch J2000.0 Equinox ICRS
- Constellation: Corona Australis
- Right ascension: 19^{h} 01^{m} 53.6503^{s}
- Declination: −36° 57′ 07.87″
- Apparent magnitude (V): +11.91

Characteristics
- Spectral type: B5IIIpe
- Variable type: INSA

Astrometry
Radial velocity (R_{v})	−36.0±4.9 km/s
Proper motion (μ)	RA: 1.582 mas/yr Dec.: −30.835 mas/yr
Parallax (π)	10.5361±0.6971 mas
Distance	152.9+8.1 −7.3 pc
Absolute magnitude (M_{V})	−0.30

Orbit
Period (P)	45±2 yr
Semi-major axis (a)	0.1968±0.0045" (27-28 AU)
Eccentricity (e)	0.4
Inclination (i)	70°

Details

A
Mass	3.5 M_{☉}
Radius	6.2 R_{☉}
Luminosity	132 L_{☉}
Temperature	9,550 K
Age	1+1 −0.5 Myr

B
Mass	0.3 - 0.55 M_{☉}
Surface gravity (log g)	3.45±0.06 cgs
Temperature	3,650 - 3,870 K

Other designations
- CD−37°13027, HIP 93449, Wray 15-1887

Database references
SIMBAD	data

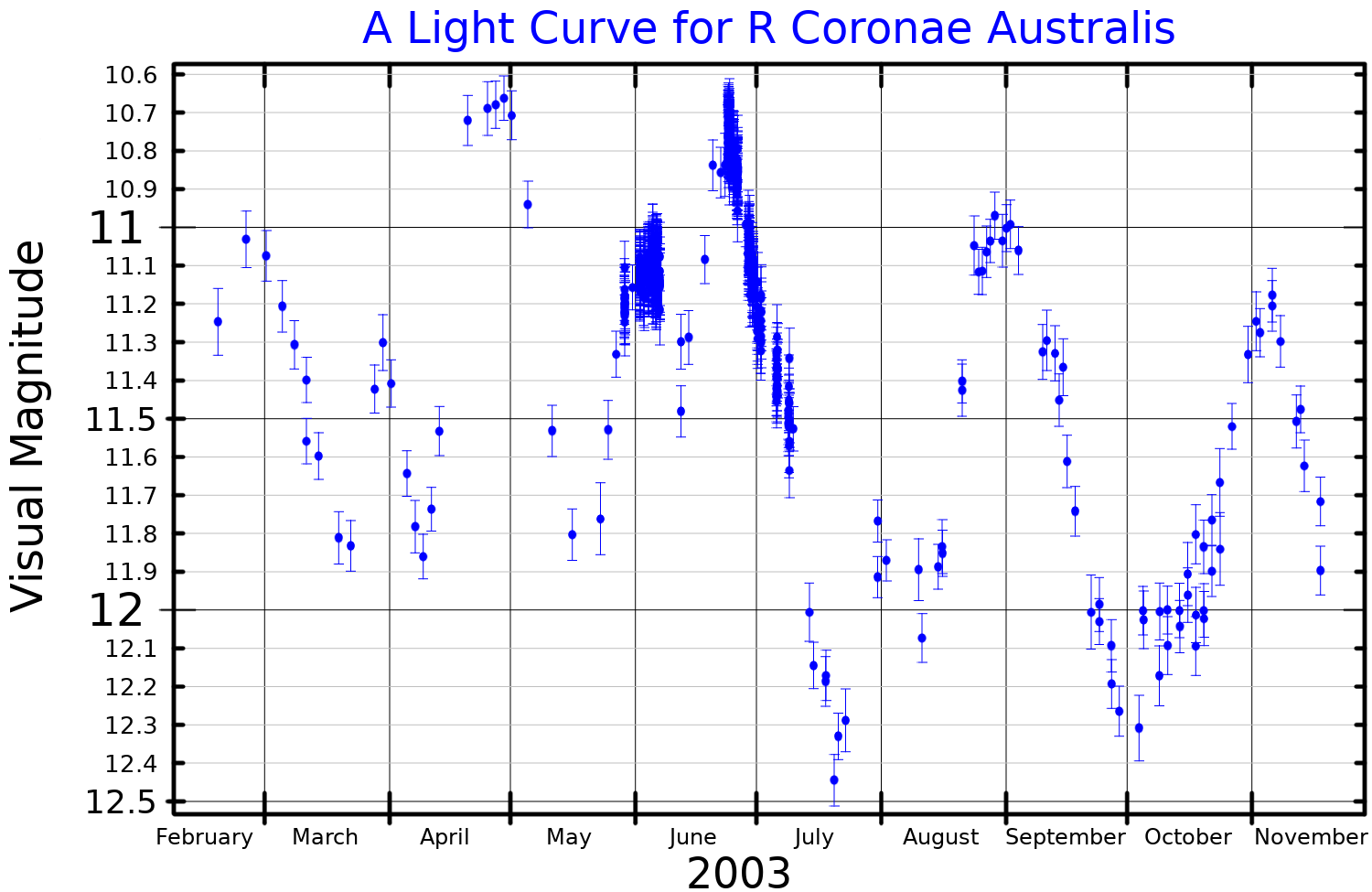
A visual band light curve for R Coronae Australis, plotted from ASAS data

R Coronae Australis (R CrA) is a variable binary system in the constellation Corona Australis. It has varied between magnitudes 10 and 14.36. A small reflection/emission nebula NGC 6729 extends from the star towards SE. It is also the brightest feature of the Coronet Cluster, therefore sometimes called R CrA Cluster.

This star is moving toward the Solar System with a radial velocity of 36 km s^{−1}. It was previously believed that in roughly 222,000 years, this system could have approached within 1.77 light-years (0.54 parsecs) of the Sun. However, the estimate had a considerable margin of error in it. With the release of Gaia DR2, the star was determined to be 4 times further from the Sun than initially believed, constraining the approach to only 111 ± 31 light-years (34.0 ± 9.5 parsecs). Examination of other objects known to be in the same star-forming region gives a distance of 152.9+8.1
−7.3 pc, suggesting an error in the Gaia parallax for R CrA itself.

Johann Friedrich Julius Schmidt discovered that R Coronae Australis is a variable star, in 1865. It appeared with its variable star designation in Annie Jump Cannon's 1907 work Second Catalogue of Variable Stars.

A companion to the star was proposed in 2019 with a mass between 0.1 and 1 Solar masses, depending on the characteristics of the stellar environment, orbiting the primary in 43–47 years. The companion was later directly observed to be a red dwarf with a mass between 0.3 M_{☉} and 0.55 M_{☉}. It has also been proposed that the primary component is itself a close binary.
