= Lambda Coronae Australis =

Star in the constellation Corona Australis

Observation data Epoch J2000 Equinox J2000
- Constellation: Corona Australis
- Right ascension: 18^{h} 43^{m} 46.942^{s}
- Declination: −38° 19′ 24.391″
- Apparent magnitude (V): 5.11 + 10.01

Characteristics
- Spectral type: A0/1V + K0
- B−V color index: +0.075±0.002

Astrometry
Radial velocity (R_{v})	−26.40±4.2 km/s
Proper motion (μ)	RA: +0.637 mas/yr Dec.: −53.975 mas/yr
Parallax (π)	15.9521±0.1585 mas
Distance	204 ± 2 ly (62.7 ± 0.6 pc)
Absolute magnitude (M_{V})	1.15

Details

λ CrA A
Mass	2.17±0.10 M_{☉}
Radius	2.24 R_{☉}
Luminosity	31.25 L_{☉}
Surface gravity (log g)	4.08±0.08 cgs
Temperature	8,609 K
Metallicity [Fe/H]	−0.30 dex
Rotational velocity (v sin i)	148.6±1.6 km/s
Age	273 Myr

Other designations
- λ CrA, CD−38°13036, HD 172777, HIP 91875, HR 7021, SAO 210501, WDS J18438-3819A

Database references
SIMBAD	data

Lambda Coronae Australis is a binary star system located in the southern constellation of Corona Australis. Its name is a Bayer designation that is Latinized from λ Coronae Australis, and abbreviated Lambda CrA or λ CrA. This system is visible to the naked eye as a faint, white-hued point of light with an apparent visual magnitude of 5.11. The system is located at a distance of approximately 204 light-years (63 pc), based on parallax, and is drifting further away with a radial velocity of −26 km/s.

The primary member of this system, designated component A, is an A-type main-sequence star with a stellar classification of A0/1V. It is 273 million years old and is spinning with a projected rotational velocity of 149 km/s. This high rotation rate is producing an equatorial bulge that is 7% larger than the polar radius. It has 2.17 times the mass of the Sun and 2.24 times the Sun's radius. The star is radiating 31 times the Sun's luminosity from its photosphere at an effective temperature of 8,609 K.

The secondary companion, component B, has an apparent visual magnitude of 10.01 and a class of K0. As of 2016, it has an angular separation of 29.5″ from the primary along a position angle of 213°. Component C is a visual companion of magnitude 9.9 and separation 43.3″ from the primary.
