= TY Coronae Australis =

Star in the constellation Corona Australis

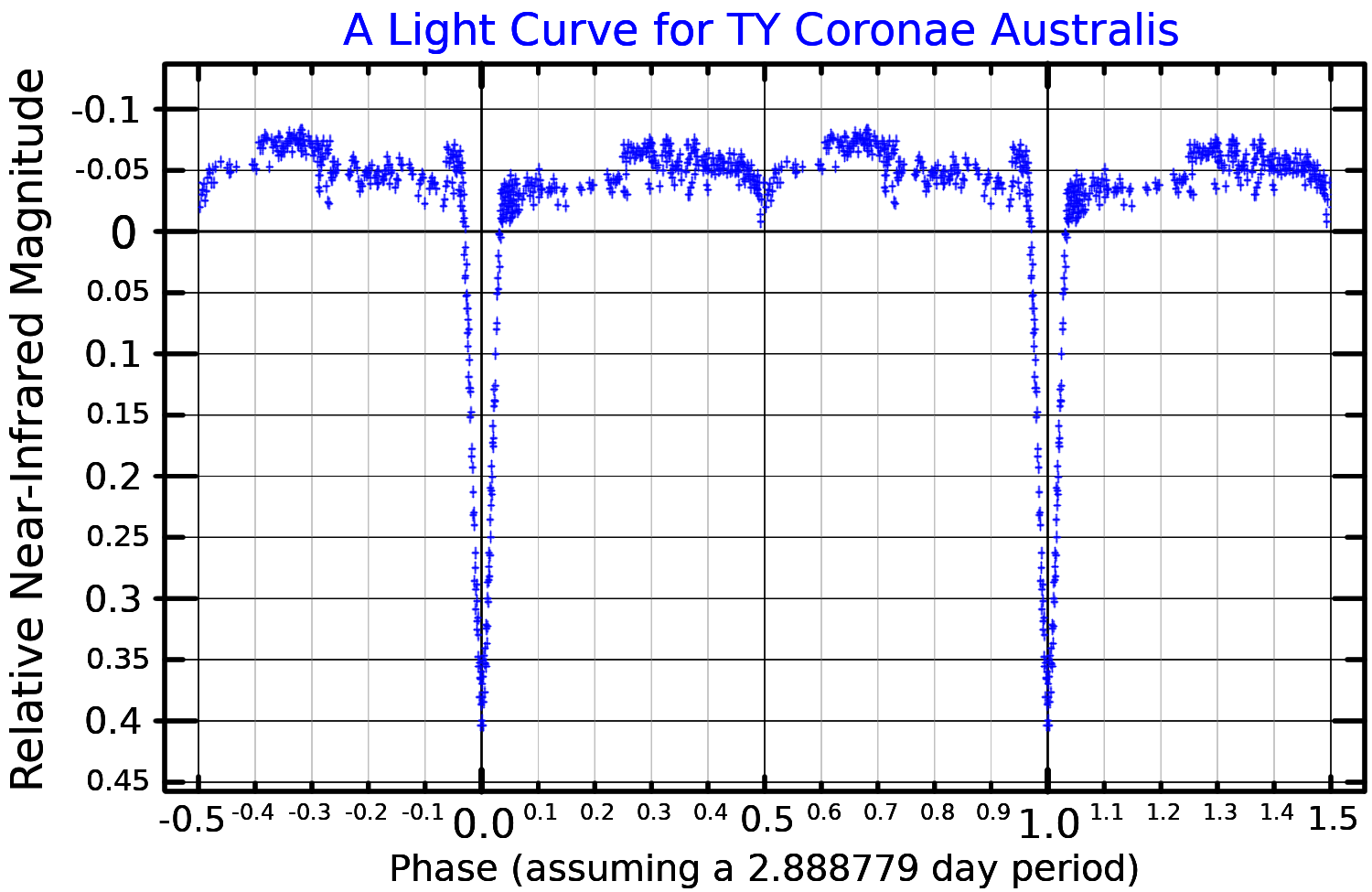
- The y band (near infrared) light curve for TY Coronae Australis, adapted from Vaz et al. (1998)

Observation data Epoch J2000.0 Equinox J2000.0 (ICRS)
- Constellation: Corona Australis
- Right ascension: 19^{h} 01^{m} 40.83122^{s}
- Declination: −36° 52′ 33.8018″
- Apparent magnitude (V): 9.39

Characteristics
- Spectral type: B9e

Astrometry
Proper motion (μ)	RA: −2.147±0.239 mas/yr Dec.: −32.723±0.226 mas/yr
Parallax (π)	7.3290±0.1456 mas
Distance	445 ± 9 ly (136 ± 3 pc)

Other designations
- TY CrA, CD−37°13024, SAO 210829

Database references
SIMBAD	data

TY Coronae Australis (abbreviated as TY CrA), is a young star system around 3 million years old in the constellation Corona Australis. It is composed of a blue-white B-class star around triple the Sun's mass and a cooler smaller companion around half its mass (or 1.6 times that of the Sun). The system is an eclipsing binary with a period of 2.8 days.

Robert T. A. Innes announced his discovery that the star is a variable star, in 1916.
