= NGC 6729 =

Reflection nebula in the constellation Corona Australis

Reflection nebula
- emission nebula
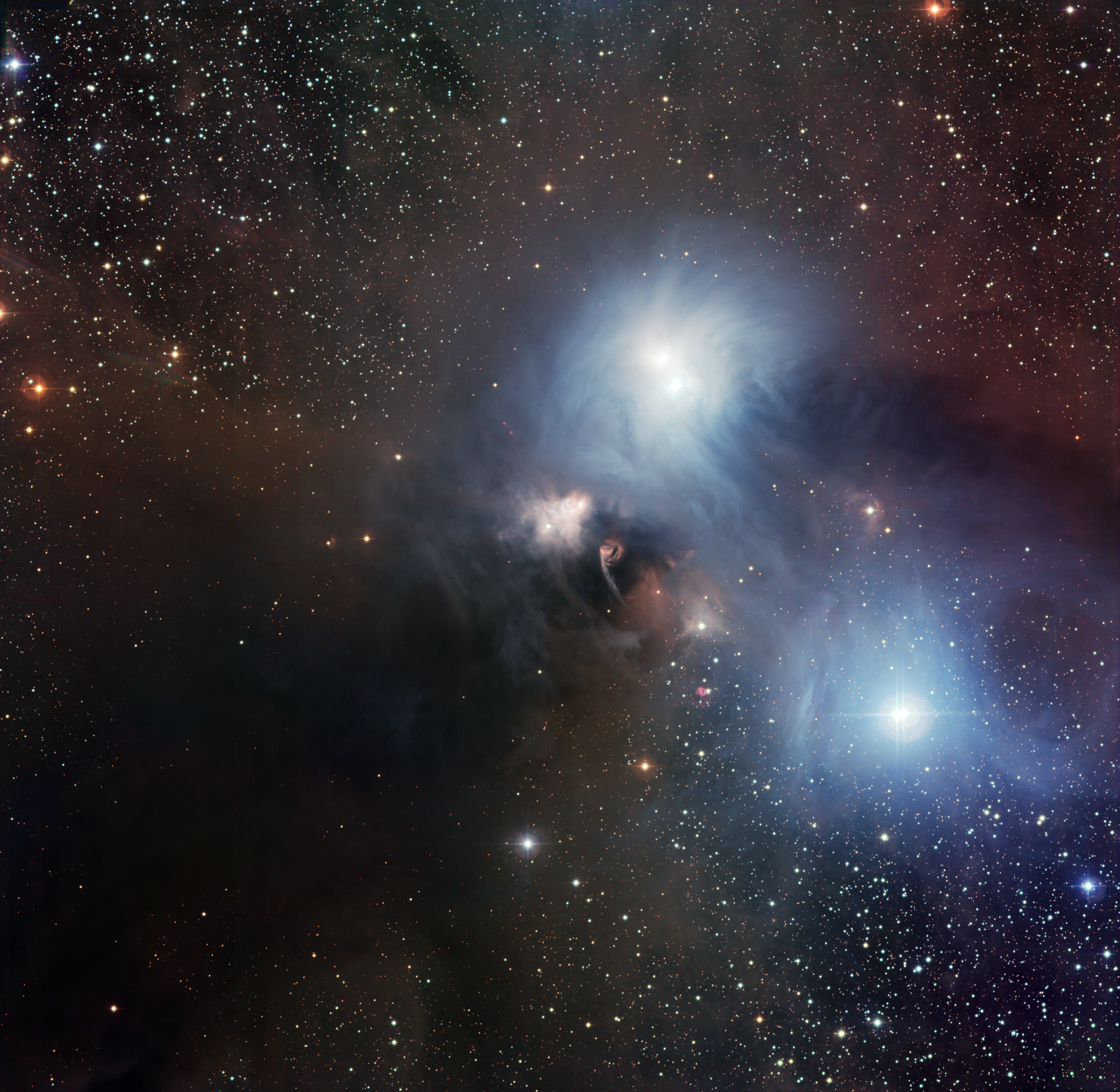
- NGC 6729 is the bright fan like nebula at the center of the image.

Observation data: J2000 epoch
- Right ascension: 19^{h} 01^{m} 54.1^{s}
- Declination: −36° 57′ 12″
- Apparent dimensions (V): 2.5′ × 2.0′
- Constellation: Corona Australis
- Designations: Caldwell 68

NGC 6729 (also known as Caldwell 68) is a reflection/emission nebula of the Corona Australis Molecular Cloud in the constellation Corona Australis. It was discovered by Johann Friedrich Julius Schmidt in 1861.

This fan-shaped nebula opens from the star R Coronae Australis toward the star T CrA to the south-east. R CrA is a pre-main-sequence star in the Corona Australis molecular complex, one of the closer star-forming regions of the galaxy at a distance of 130 pc. NGC 6729 is a variable nebula which shows irregular variations in brightness and in shape.

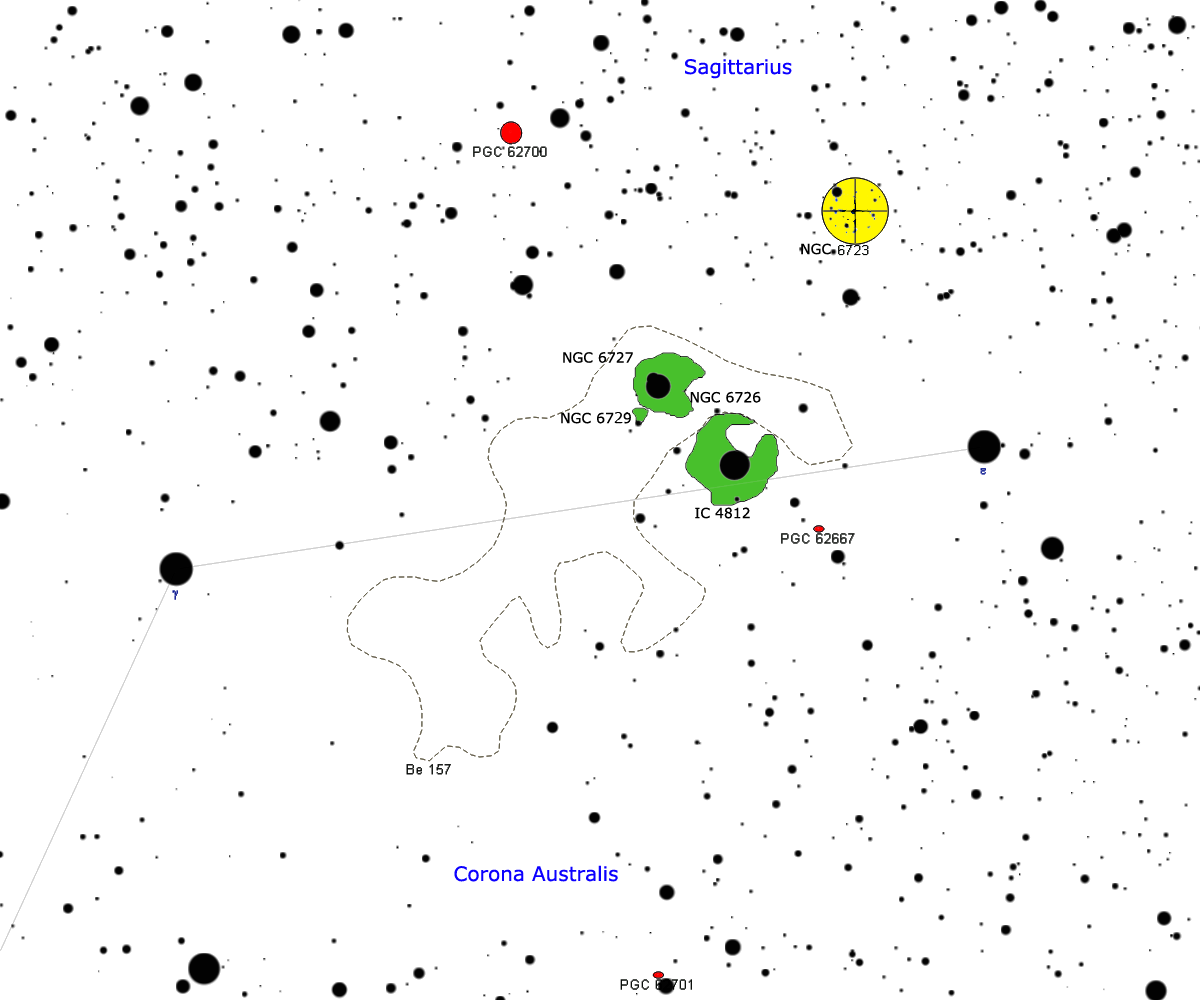
Map showing location of NGC 6729 (Roberto Mura)

== See also ==
- McNeil's Nebula
- NGC 1555 (Hind's Variable Nebula)
- NGC 2261 (Hubble's Variable Nebula)
