= Delta Coronae Australis =

Star in the constellation Corona Australis

- Location of δ Coronae Australis (circled in red)

Observation data Epoch J2000 Equinox ICRS
- Constellation: Corona Australis
- Right ascension: 19^{h} 08^{m} 20.970^{s}
- Declination: −40° 29′ 48.113″
- Apparent magnitude (V): 4.57

Characteristics
- Evolutionary stage: horizontal branch
- Spectral type: K1III
- B−V color index: +1.070±0.052

Astrometry
Radial velocity (R_{v})	+21.24±0.19 km/s
Proper motion (μ)	RA: +47.391 mas/yr Dec.: −27.246 mas/yr
Parallax (π)	17.6582±0.246 mas
Distance	185 ± 3 ly (56.6 ± 0.8 pc)
Absolute magnitude (M_{V})	0.93

Details
Mass	1.50±0.01 M_{☉}
Radius	11.25±0.11 R_{☉}
Luminosity	53±1 L_{☉}
Surface gravity (log g)	2.59±0.10 cgs
Temperature	4,645±14 K
Metallicity [Fe/H]	+0.01±0.10 dex
Age	2.80±0.13 Gyr

Other designations
- Qedty, δ CrA, CD−40°13061, HD 177873, HIP 94005, HR 7242, SAO 229513

Database references
SIMBAD	data

Delta Coronae Australis, also named Qedty, is a single star located in the southern constellation of Corona Australis. Its Bayer designation is Latinized from δ Coronae Australis, and abbreviated Delta CrA or δ CrA. This body is visible to the naked eye as a faint, orange-hued star with an apparent visual magnitude of 4.57. The star is located at a distance of about 185 light-years (57 pc) from the Sun based on parallax, and is drifting further away with a radial velocity of +21 km/s.

This object is an evolved giant star with a stellar classification of K1III. After exhausting the supply of hydrogen at its core, the star expanded off the main sequence and now has 11.25 times the radius of the Sun. It is a red clump giant, which indicates it is on the horizontal branch and is generating energy through core helium fusion. The star is 2.8 billion years old with 1.5 times the mass of the Sun. It is radiating 53 times the Sun's luminosity from its enlarged photosphere at an effective temperature of 4,645 K.

This star was part of the ancient Egyptian constellation Qedty, the Two Nets, used in decan star clocks. The IAU Working Group on Star Names adopted the name Qedty for this star on 13 August 2026.
