= Zeta Coronae Australis =

Star in the constellation Corona Australis

- Location of ζ Coronae Australis (circled in red)

Observation data Epoch J2000.0 Equinox J2000.0 (ICRS)
- Constellation: Corona Australis
- Right ascension: 19^{h} 03^{m} 06.877^{s}
- Declination: −42° 05′ 42.380″
- Apparent magnitude (V): +4.75

Characteristics
- Evolutionary stage: main sequence
- Spectral type: B9.5 Vann
- U−B color index: −0.07
- B−V color index: −0.02

Astrometry
Radial velocity (R_{v})	–13.0±4.2 km/s
Proper motion (μ)	RA: +56.270 mas/yr Dec.: −45.680 mas/yr
Parallax (π)	18.2019±0.1261 mas
Distance	179 ± 1 ly (54.9 ± 0.4 pc)
Absolute magnitude (M_{V})	+0.76

Details
Mass	2.92 M_{☉}
Radius	2.11 R_{☉}
Luminosity	51 L_{☉}
Surface gravity (log g)	4.21±0.14 cgs
Temperature	12,039±409 K
Metallicity [Fe/H]	−0.21 dex
Rotational velocity (v sin i)	308 km/s
Age	76 Myr

Other designations
- ζ CrA, CD−42°13855, FK5 3519, GC 26165, HD 176638, HIP 93542, HR 7188, SAO 229461

Database references
SIMBAD	data

Zeta Coronae Australis is a solitary, blue-white hued star located in the southern constellation Corona Australis. Its name is a Bayer designation that is Latinized from ζ Coronae Australis, and abbreviated ζ CrA or ζ CrA. With an apparent visual magnitude of +4.75, it is sufficiently bright to be viewed with the naked eye. Based upon an annual parallax shift of 18.20 mas as seen from Earth, this star is located around 179 light-years (54.9 pc) from the Sun. At that distance, the visual magnitude is diminished by an extinction of 0.15 due to interstellar dust.

This is a B-type main sequence star with a stellar classification of B9.5 Vann. The suffix notation 'nn' indicates there are broad spectrum absorption lines in the spectrum associated with its rotation period. At the estimated age of just 76 million years, it is spinning rapidly with a projected rotational velocity of 308 km/s. The star has 2.92 times the mass of the Sun and 2.11 times the Sun's radius. It is radiating 51 times the Sun's luminosity from its photosphere at an effective temperature of about 12,039 K.

There is an infrared excess at a wavelength of 60 μm. This suggests there is a circumstellar disk of dust with a temperature of 120 K orbiting 34 AU from the host star.
