= T Coronae Australis =

Young star in the constellation Corona Australis

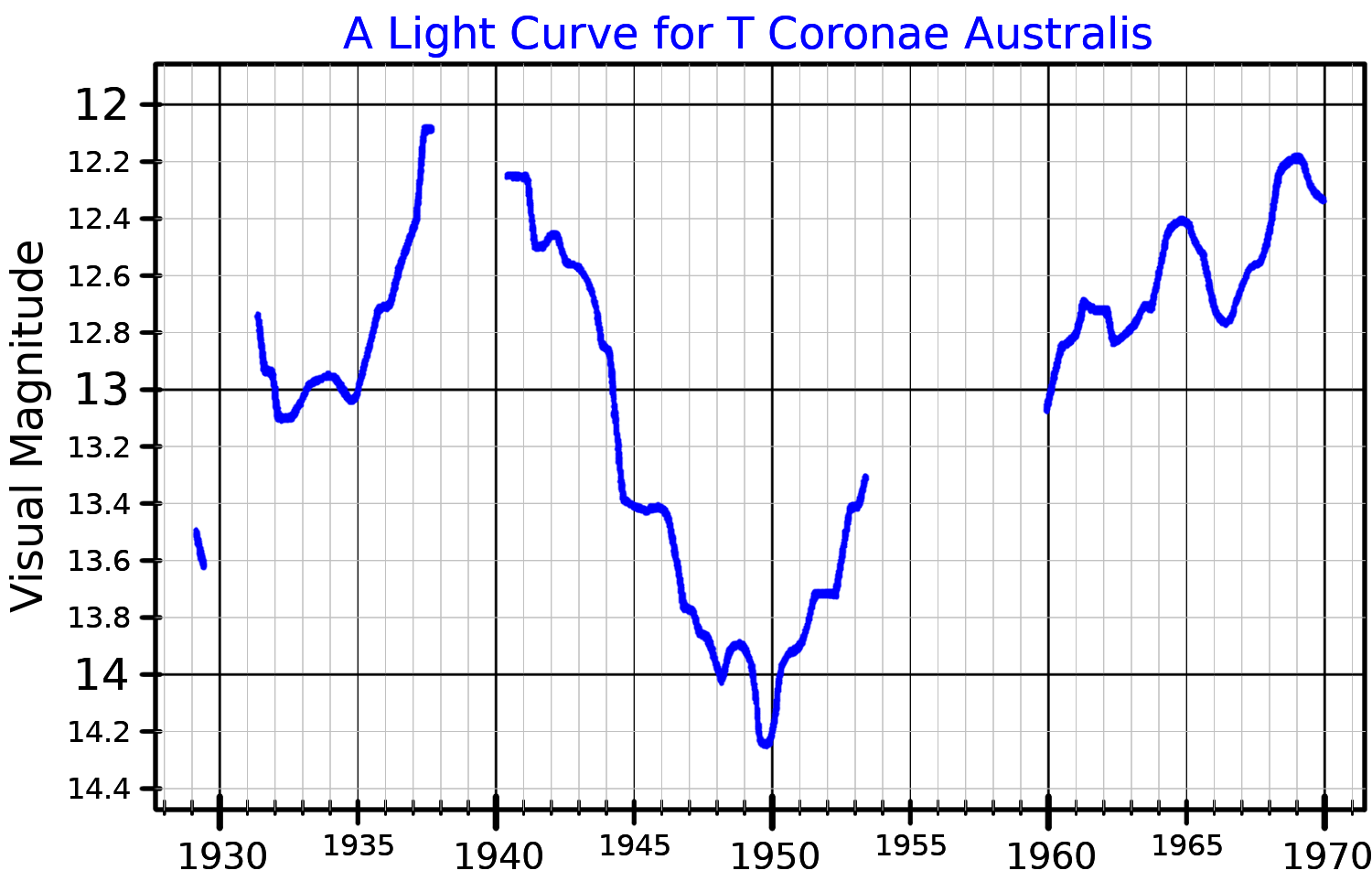
- A visual band light curve for T Coronae Australis, adapted from Bellingham and Rossano (1980)

Observation data Epoch J2000.0 Equinox J2000.0 (ICRS)
- Constellation: Corona Australis
- Right ascension: 19^{h} 01^{m} 58.790^{s}
- Declination: −36° 57′ 50.33″
- Apparent magnitude (V): 11.67

Characteristics
- Spectral type: F0
- Variable type: Herbig Ae/Be star

Astrometry
Radial velocity (R_{v})	1.1 km/s
Proper motion (μ)	RA: 5.3±4.7 mas/yr Dec.: −24.9±4.7 mas/yr
Distance	502.3 ly (154.0 pc)

Position (relative to A)
Component	B
Epoch of observation	2023 – 2024
Angular distance	153.2±1.2 mas
Position angle	275.4±0.1°
Projected separation	23 AU

Details

A
Mass	1.7 M_{☉}
Luminosity	28.8 L_{☉}

B
Mass	0.9 M_{☉}

Other designations
- T CrA, 2MASS 19015878-3657498

Database references
SIMBAD	data

T Coronae Australis (T CrA), is a binary star in the constellation Corona Australis. It is a member of the Corona Australis star-forming region, which is located about 502 light-years (154.0 pc) away. It is a Herbig Ae/Be star, still in the first stages of star formation, and is surrounded by a circumstellar disk seen edge-on.

Johann Friedrich Julius Schmidt discovered that it is a variable star, in 1876. It appeared with its variable star designation in Annie Jump Cannon's 1907 work Second Catalogue of Variable Stars.

As of 2024, the stars are separated by 153 mas along a position angle of 275°. Their observed physical separation is 23 astronomical units. The primary component is 1.7 times as massive as the Sun, while the secondary is 0.9 times as massive.
