= Kappa1 Coronae Australis =

Star in the constellation Corona Australis

κ^{1} Coronae Australis
Observation data Epoch J2000.0 Equinox ICRS
- Constellation: Corona Australis
- Right ascension: 18^{h} 33^{m} 23.0809^{s}
- Declination: −38° 43′ 12.166″
- Apparent magnitude (V): 6.17±0.01

Characteristics
- Evolutionary stage: main sequence
- Spectral type: A0 IV
- B−V color index: −0.06

Astrometry
Radial velocity (R_{v})	−16±3.7 km/s
Proper motion (μ)	RA: −0.512 mas/yr Dec.: −22.550 mas/yr
Parallax (π)	4.4833±0.0831 mas
Distance	730 ± 10 ly (223 ± 4 pc)
Absolute magnitude (M_{V})	−0.78

Details
Mass	2.82±0.38 M_{☉}
Radius	3.79±0.15 R_{☉}
Luminosity	179±14 L_{☉}
Surface gravity (log g)	3.73±0.07 cgs
Temperature	11,079 K
Metallicity [Fe/H]	−0.2 dex
Rotational velocity (v sin i)	339 km/s
Age	4.1±1.8 Myr

Other designations
- κ^{1} CrA, 16 G. Coronae Australis, CD−38°12896, CPD−38°7538, GC 25315, HD 170868, HIP 90969, HR 6952, SAO 210296, WDS J18334-3844B

Database references
SIMBAD	data

Kappa^{1} Coronae Australis is a white-hued star located in the southern constellation Corona Australis. Its name is a Bayer designation that is Latinized from κ^{1} Coronae Australis, and abbreviated Kappa^{1} CrA or κ^{1} CrA. This star has an apparent magnitude of 6.17, placing it near the limit for naked eye visibility.

There has been some disagreement about the object's distance. The New Hipparcos Reduction calculates a parallax of 21.18±6.53 mas, yielding a distance of 154±47 light years, somewhat poorly constrained. New analysis from the Gaia spacecraft find that it has a physical relation to κ^{2} Coronae Australis. Both of their currently parallaxes place them around 700 light years away. As of 2018, the two stars have an angular separation of 20.5″ along a position angle of 359°.

Kappa^{1} CrA has a stellar classification of A0 IV. At present it has 2.8 times the mass of the Sun and a slightly enlarged radius of 3.79 R_{☉}. It radiates at 179 times the luminosity of the Sun from its photosphere at an effective temperature of 11,079 K. Kappa1 CrA's metallicity – specifically the iron abundance – is 63% that of the Sun. With an age of about four million years, Kappa^{1} CrA is modelled to be a young star only about 10% of the way through its main sequence life. It is spinning rapidly with a projected rotational velocity of 339 km/s.
