= Gamma Coronae Australis =

Star in the constellation Corona Australis

γ Coronae Australis
- Location of γ Coronae Australis (circled)

Observation data Epoch J2000.0 Equinox J2000.0 (ICRS)
- Constellation: Corona Australis
- Right ascension: 19^{h} 06^{m} 25.11014^{s}
- Declination: −37° 03′ 48.3901″
- Apparent magnitude (V): 4.20

Characteristics
- Spectral type: F8V + F8V
- U−B color index: +0.51
- B−V color index: +0.01

Astrometry
Radial velocity (R_{v})	−51.60±0.3 km/s
Proper motion (μ)	RA: 96.74±1.05 mas/yr Dec.: −281.71±0.58 mas/yr
Parallax (π)	57.79±0.75 mas
Distance	56.4 ± 0.7 ly (17.3 ± 0.2 pc)
Absolute magnitude (M_{V})	3.73 / 3.80

Orbit
Period (P)	121.76 yr
Semi-major axis (a)	1.896″
Eccentricity (e)	0.320
Inclination (i)	149.6°
Longitude of the node (Ω)	50.3°
Periastron epoch (T)	2000.64
Argument of periastron (ω) (secondary)	349.0°

Details

γ CrA A
Mass	1.15 M_{☉}
Radius	1.47 R_{☉}
Surface gravity (log g)	4.17 cgs
Temperature	6,090 K
Metallicity [Fe/H]	−0.07 dex
Age	5 Gyr

γ CrA B
Mass	1.14 M_{☉}
Radius	1.42 R_{☉}
Surface gravity (log g)	4.19 cgs
Temperature	6,100 K
Metallicity [Fe/H]	−0.07 dex
Age	5 Gyr

Other designations
- γ CrA, CD−37°13048, HIP 93825, SAO 210928, CCDM J19064-3704
- γ CrA A: HD 177474, HR 7226
- γ CrA B: HD 177475, HR 7227

Database references
SIMBAD	γ CrA
- γ CrA A
- γ CrA B

Gamma Coronae Australis is a binary star system located in the constellation Corona Australis. Its name is a Bayer designation that is Latinized from γ Coronae Australis, and abbreviated γ CrA or γ CrA. The system has a combined apparent visual magnitude of 4.20, making it faintly visible to the naked eye. It is located at a distance of 56.4 light-years (17.3 pc) from the Sun, based on its parallax. Gamma Coronae Australis is a member of the Milky Way's thin disk.

This has long been known as a wide visual binary, so its orbit has been computed from observations of its members. Its two components have been given separate Henry Draper Catalogue designations of HD 177474 and HD 177475, respectively. The two stars are separated by 1.896″ and orbit each other every 121.76 years with an eccentricity of 0.320.

Both components are nearly identical late F-type main-sequence stars with a stellar classification of F8V. The primary, component A, has an absolute an absolute magnitude of +3.73. It has 1.15 times the mass of the Sun and 1.47 times the Sun's radius. The star has an effective temperature of 6,090 K. The secondary, component B, has an absolute magnitude of +3.80. It is only slightly smaller than the primary with 1.14 times the mass and 1.42 times the radius of the Sun. Its effective temperature is 6,100 K.
