= Theta Coronae Australis =

Star in the constellation Corona Australis

θ Coronae Australis
- Location of Theta CrA (circled)

Observation data Epoch J2000.0 Equinox ICRS
- Constellation: Corona Australis
- Right ascension: 18^{h} 33^{m} 30.18577^{s}
- Declination: −42° 18′ 45.0297″
- Apparent magnitude (V): 4.61±0.01

Characteristics
- Spectral type: G8 III
- U−B color index: +0.76
- B−V color index: +1.02

Astrometry
Radial velocity (R_{v})	−2.1±2.8 km/s
Proper motion (μ)	RA: +32.046 mas/yr Dec.: −20.932 mas/yr
Parallax (π)	6.1673±0.1535 mas
Distance	530 ± 10 ly (162 ± 4 pc)
Absolute magnitude (M_{V})	−1.54

Details
Mass	4.45±0.22 M_{☉}
Radius	29.1±1.5 R_{☉}
Luminosity	411^{+21}_{−19} L_{☉}
Surface gravity (log g)	2.50 cgs
Temperature	4,907±59 K
Metallicity [Fe/H]	+0.00 dex
Rotational velocity (v sin i)	12±1 km/s

Other designations
- Bie, θ CrA, 15 G. Coronae Australis, CD−42°13378, CPD−42°8423, FK5 697, GC 25313, HD 170845, HIP 90982, HR 6951, SAO 229111

Database references
SIMBAD	data

Theta Coronae Australis, also named Bie, is a solitary yellow-hued star located in the southern constellation of Corona Australis. Its Bayer designation is Latinized from θ Coronae Australis, and abbreviated Theta CrA or θ CrA. This star has an apparent magnitude of 4.61, making it readily visible to the naked eye. Gaia DR3 parallax measurements place it 530 light years away. It is drifting closer with a heliocentric radial velocity of roughly −2 km/s. At its current distance, Theta CrA's brightness is diminished by three-tenths of a magnitudes due to interstellar dust. It has an absolute magnitude of −1.54.

This is an evolved red giant with a stellar classification of G8 III. It has 4.45 times the mass of the Sun but has expanded to 29.1 times the solar radius. It radiates 411 times the luminosity of the Sun from its enlarged photosphere at an effective temperature of 4,907 K. Theta CrA has a solar metallicity. Unlike most giant stars of this type, Theta CrA has an unusually high rate of rotation with a projected rotational velocity of 12 km/s. The star may have an infrared excess, suggesting the presence of a circumstellar disk of dust. One possible explanation is that it may have engulfed a nearby giant planet, such as a hot Jupiter.

In Chinese astronomy, this star is part of the constellation Biē (鳖, River Turtle). The IAU Working Group on Star Names adopted the name Bie for this star on 13 August 2026, after this Chinese constellation.
