= Epsilon Coronae Australis =

Variable star in the constellation Corona Australis

- Location of ε Coronae Australis (circled in red)

Observation data Epoch J2000 Equinox ICRS
- Constellation: Corona Australis
- Right ascension: 18^{h} 58^{m} 43.383^{s}
- Declination: −37° 06′ 26.381″
- Apparent magnitude (V): 4.83±0.02; 4.74; Min I: 5.00; Min II: 4.95

Characteristics
- Spectral type: F4V Fe-0.8
- U−B color index: +0.01
- B−V color index: +0.39
- Variable type: W UMa

Astrometry
Radial velocity (R_{v})	57.90±1.2 km/s
Proper motion (μ)	RA: −131.234 mas/yr Dec.: +98.230 mas/yr
Parallax (π)	31.8084±0.1122 mas
Distance	102.5 ± 0.4 ly (31.4 ± 0.1 pc)
Absolute magnitude (M_{V})	2.21 (2.39 + 4.98)

Orbit
Period (P)	0.59145447(30) days
Semi-major axis (a)	3.82±0.02 R_{☉}
Eccentricity (e)	0
Inclination (i)	74.02±0.14°
Periastron epoch (T)	HJD 3966.6892(0.0696)
Semi-amplitude (K_{1}) (primary)	36.40±0.05 km/s
Semi-amplitude (K_{2}) (secondary)	273.70±0.05 km/s

Details

ε CrA A
Mass	1.89±0.16 M_{☉}
Radius	2.14±0.09 R_{☉}
Luminosity	8.9±1.8 L_{☉}
Temperature	6,820±200 K
Rotational velocity (v sin i)	148.5 km/s
Age	2.83±0.28 Gyr

ε CrA B
Mass	0.25±0.04 M_{☉}
Radius	0.84±0.04 R_{☉}
Luminosity	0.85±0.14 L_{☉}
Surface gravity (log g)	3.99±0.03 cgs
Temperature	6,050±100 K
Age	2.83±0.28 Gyr

Other designations
- ε CrA, CD−37°13001, CPD−37°8433, HD 175813, HIP 93174, HR 7152, SAO 210781

Database references
SIMBAD	data

Epsilon Coronae Australis is a close binary star system located in the constellation Corona Australis. Nicolas Louis de Lacaille gave Epsilon Coronae Australis its Bayer designation, which is Latinized from ε Coronae Australis and abbreviated ε CrA or ε CrA. It is also known as HR 7152, and HD 175813.

Varying in brightness between apparent magnitudes of 4.74 to 5 over 14 hours, this is the brightest W Ursae Majoris variable (low mass contact binary) in the night sky. Based on parallax measurements, it is located at a distance of 102.5 light-years (31.4 pc) from the Sun. The system is drifting further away with a line of sight velocity component of 58 km/s.

== Properties ==
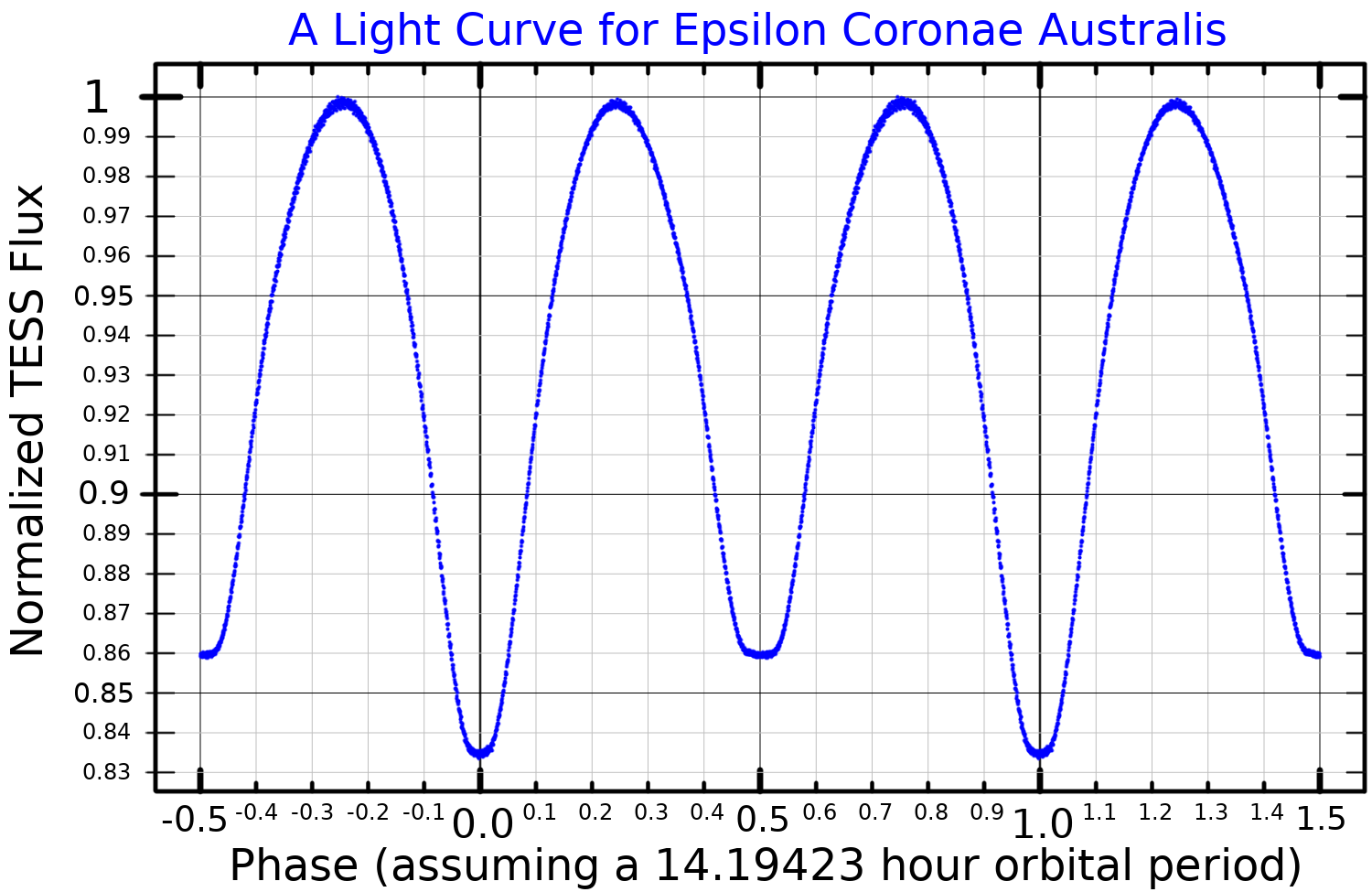
A light curve for Epsilon Coronae Australis plotted from TESS data

Epsilon Coronae Australis is an F4V dwarf star with an effective temperature of 6000 Kelvin. It ranges between apparent magnitudes of 4.74 to 5 over 14 hours, an absolute magnitude of +2.45, and a mass of 1.1 solar masses. Epsilon Coronae Australis is a W Ursae Majoris variable, indicating that it has a contact companion within the Roche limit of the primary. The pair orbit each other with a period of 14.19 h at a separation of just 3.82 R_{☉}.

Yildiz and colleagues estimated the age of the system at 2.83±0.28 billion years based on study of the properties of the system and estimated rate of mass transfer. They found the current masses of the primary and secondary to be 1.72±0.04 and 0.22±0.02 solar masses respectively, from their original masses of 1.06±0.03 and 2.18±0.06 solar masses. The stars will eventually merge in a not too distant future.
