= Beta Coronae Australis =

Star in the constellation Corona Australis

- Location of β CrA (circled)

Observation data Epoch J2000 Equinox ICRS
- Constellation: Corona Australis
- Right ascension: 19^{h} 10^{m} 01.75580^{s}
- Declination: −39° 20′ 26.8644″
- Apparent magnitude (V): 4.10±0.01

Characteristics
- Spectral type: K0 II/III CN1.5
- U−B color index: +1.07
- B−V color index: +1.20
- R−I color index: +0.61

Astrometry
Radial velocity (R_{v})	2.7±0.7 km/s
Proper motion (μ)	RA: +4.37 mas/yr Dec.: −36.65 mas/yr
Parallax (π)	6.88±0.25 mas
Distance	470 ± 20 ly (145 ± 5 pc)
Absolute magnitude (M_{V})	−1.71

Details
Mass	5.17±0.26 M_{☉}
Radius	38.5±1.9 R_{☉}
Luminosity	614±33 L_{☉}
Surface gravity (log g)	1.26 cgs
Temperature	4,575±55 K
Metallicity [Fe/H]	+0.24 dex
Rotational velocity (v sin i)	6.2±2 km/s

Other designations
- Alqubba, β CrA, 46 G. Coronae Australis, CD−39°13146, CPD−39°8327, GC 26380, HD 178345, HIP 94160, HR 7259, SAO 211005, PPM 298639

Database references
SIMBAD	data

Beta Coronae Australis, also named Alqubba, is a solitary star located in the southern constellation Corona Australis. Its Bayer designation is Latinized from β Coronae Australis, and abbreviated Beta CrA or β CrA. This body is visible to the naked eye as a faint, orange-hued star with an apparent visual magnitude of 4.10. The star is located around 470 light years distant from the Sun based on parallax, and is drifting further away with a radial velocity of 2.7 km/s. At its current distance, Beta CrA's brightness is diminished by 0.29 magnitudes due to interstellar dust.

Beta CrA has a stellar classification of K0 II/III CN1.5, indicating that it is an evolved K-type star with the blended luminosity class of a bright giant and a regular giant star. The suffix CN1.5 indicates that the object has an anomalous overabundance of cyano radicals in its spectrum, making it a CN star. Having exhausted the supply of hydrogen at its core, the star has expanded to 39 times the Sun's girth. It has 5.17 times the mass of the Sun shines with a luminosity 614 times that of the Sun from its photosphere at a surface temperature of 4,575 K. Beta CrA is metal enriched (174% solar iron abundance) and spins modestly with a projected rotational velocity of 6.2 km/s.

Al-Qubba (القُبَّة), the dome or domed tent, is a traditional Arabic name for Corona Australis. The IAU Working Group on Star Names adopted the name Alqubba for this star on 13 August 2026.
