= Eta2 Coronae Australis =

Star in the constellation Corona Austrlis

η^{2} Coronae Australis]]
- Location of Eta^{2} CrA (circled)

Observation data Epoch J2000.0 Equinox ICRS
- Constellation: Corona Australis
- Right ascension: 18^{h} 49^{m} 34.99649^{s}
- Declination: −43° 26′ 02.7522″
- Apparent magnitude (V): 5.59±0.01

Characteristics
- Evolutionary stage: main sequence star
- Spectral type: B9 IV
- B−V color index: −0.08

Astrometry
Radial velocity (R_{v})	−23.0±4.3 km/s
Proper motion (μ)	RA: −2.963 mas/yr Dec.: −25.374 mas/yr
Parallax (π)	4.2500±0.1158 mas
Distance	770 ± 20 ly (235 ± 6 pc)
Absolute magnitude (M_{V})	−0.24

Details
Mass	3.23±0.08 M_{☉}
Radius	5.82±0.31 R_{☉}
Luminosity	171^{+20}_{−18} L_{☉}
Surface gravity (log g)	3.47 cgs
Temperature	10,940±255 K
Metallicity [Fe/H]	+0.06 dex
Rotational velocity (v sin i)	30 km/s
Age	213 Myr

Other designations
- Eta^{2} CrA, 26 G. Coronae Australis, CD−43°12854, CPD−43°8779, GC 25766, HD 173861, HIP 92382, HR 7068, SAO 229307

Database references
SIMBAD	data

Eta^{2} Coronae Australis is a solitary star located in the southern constellation of Corona Australis. Its name is a Bayer designation that is Latinized from η^{2} Coronae Australis, and abbreviated Eta^{2} CrA or η^{2} CrA. This object is faintly visible to the naked eye as a dim, blue-white hued star with an apparent visual magnitude of 5.59. Gaia DR3 parallax measurements imply a distance of 770 light-years (235 pc) from the Sun, but it is drifting closer with a radial velocity of −23 km/s. At its current distance Eta^{2} CrA's brightness is diminished by 0.27 magnitudes due to stellar extinction from interstellar dust and it has an absolute magnitude of −0.24.

This object has a stellar classification of B9 IV, suggesting that is a slightly evolved a B-type subgiant star. However, Zorec & Royer (2012) model it to be a dwarf star that has completed 80.4% of its main sequence lifetime. It is estimated to be 213 million years old and is spinning with a projected rotational velocity of 30 km The star has a mass that is 3.23 times that of the Sun, and 5.82 times the Sun's radius. It is radiating 171 times the luminosity of the Sun from its photosphere at an effective temperature of 10,940 K.

Eta^{2} CrA has a near-solar metallicity at [Fe/H] = +0.06. Some earlier catalogues listed the object as a chemically peculiar star but that status is now considered to be doubtful.
