= Eta1 Coronae Australis =

Star in the constellation Corona Australis

η^{1} Coronae Australis
Observation data Epoch J2000 Equinox ICRS
- Constellation: Corona Australis
- Right ascension: 18^{h} 48^{m} 50.49216^{s}
- Declination: −43° 40′ 48.1977″
- Apparent magnitude (V): 5.456

Characteristics
- Spectral type: A3V
- B−V color index: +0.13

Astrometry
Radial velocity (R_{v})	−4.0±4.2 km/s
Proper motion (μ)	RA: 22.312 mas/yr Dec.: −14.139 mas/yr
Parallax (π)	10.2735±0.1889 mas
Distance	317 ± 6 ly (97 ± 2 pc)
Absolute magnitude (M_{V})	0.84

Details
Mass	2.05±0.29 M_{☉}
Radius	3.43±0.12 R_{☉}
Luminosity	51 L_{☉}
Surface gravity (log g)	3.68±0.07 cgs
Temperature	8308±133 K
Metallicity [Fe/H]	−0.01 dex
Rotational velocity (v sin i)	122.3 km/s
Age	491 Myr

Other designations
- Eta^{1} CrA, CD−43°12841, FK5 1490, GC 25748, HD 173715, HIP 92308, HR 7062, SAO 229299

Database references
SIMBAD	data

Eta^{1} Coronae Australis is a suspected astrometric binary star system in the constellation of Corona Australis. Its name is a Bayer designation that is Latinized from η^{1} Coronae Australis, and abbreviated Eta^{1} CrA or η^{1} CrA. This system is visible to the naked eye as a dim, white-hued point of light with an apparent visual magnitude of 5.5. Parallax measurements put it at a distance of 317 light-years (97 pc) 317 light-years away from the Sun.

The visible component is an A-type main-sequence star with a stellar classification of A3V, which indicates it is generating energy through core hydrogen fusion. It has broad spectrum absorption lines associated with its rotation period, having a projected rotational velocity of 122.3 km/s. At an estimated age of 491 million years, this star has 2.1 times the mass of the Sun and 3.4 times the Sun's radius. It is radiating 51 times the luminosity of the Sun from its photosphere at an effective temperature of 8,308 K.
