= Kappa2 Coronae Australis =

Star in the constellation Corona Australis

κ^{2} Coronae Australis
- Location of Kappa^{2} CrA (circled)

Observation data Epoch J2000.0 Equinox ICRS
- Constellation: Corona Australis
- Right ascension: 18^{h} 33^{m} 23.13130^{s}
- Declination: −38° 43′ 33.5392″
- Apparent magnitude (V): 5.59±0.01

Characteristics
- Spectral type: B9 Vnn
- B−V color index: −0.06

Astrometry
Radial velocity (R_{v})	−15.0±7.4 km/s
Proper motion (μ)	RA: −2.911 mas/yr Dec.: −20.468 mas/yr
Parallax (π)	4.6115±0.0747 mas
Distance	710 ± 10 ly (217 ± 4 pc)

Details
Mass	3.12^{+0.41}_{−0.37} M_{☉}
Radius	5.28±0.28 R_{☉}
Luminosity	460 L_{☉}
Surface gravity (log g)	3.58±0.07 cgs
Temperature	12,600 K
Metallicity [Fe/H]	−0.10 dex

Other designations
- κ^{2} CrA, 17 G. Coronae Australis, CD−38°12895, GC 25314, HD 170868, HIP 90968, HR 6953, SAO 210294, 210295, CCDM J18334-3843A, WDS J18334-3844A

Database references
SIMBAD	data

Kappa^{2} Coronae Australis is the primary of a probable binary system located in the southern constellation Corona Australis. Its name is a Bayer designation that is Latinized from Κ^{2} Coronae Australis, and is abbreviated Kappa^{2} CrA or Κ^{2} CrA. This object is visible to the naked eye as a bluish-white hued star with an apparent visual magnitude of 5.59. The distance to this star is approximately 710 light years based on Gaia DR3 parallax measurements. The radial velocity is poorly constrained, but the star appears to be moving closer with a radial velocity of around −15 km/s. At its current distance, Kappa^{2} CrA's brightness is diminished by 0.45 magnitudes due to interstellar dust.

This is an ordinary B-type main-sequence star with a stellar classification of B9Vnn, with the nn meaning extremely nebulous absorption lines, usually due to rapid rotation. It has 3.12 times the mass of the Sun and a radius 5.28 times larger than the Sun, which is large for stars of this type. It radiates 460 times the luminosity of the Sun from its photosphere at an effective temperature of 12,600 K. The large radius combined with the high luminosity of the star may indicate that Kappa^{2} CrA is highly evolved.

Kappa^{2} CrA forms a binary star with Kappa^{1} Coronae Australis, also known as HR 6952. Kappa^{1} is located 20.5" away along a position angle of 359°. The two were once thought to be an optical pair due to the large difference in their parallaxes but are now considered to be physical based on Gaia measurements. The satellite places Kappa^{1} and Kappa^{2} around 700 light years away.
