= List of stars in Corona Australis =

This is the list of notable stars in the constellation Corona Australis, sorted by decreasing brightness.

Name	B	Var	HD	HIP	RA	Dec	vis. mag.	abs. mag.	Dist. (ly)	Sp. class	Notes
β CrA	β		178345	94160	19^{h} 10^{m} 01.75^{s}	−39° 20′ 26.5″	4.10	−1.86	508	K0II/IIICN.	Alqubba, suspected variable
α CrA	α		178253	94114	19^{h} 09^{m} 28.28^{s}	−37° 54′ 15.3″	4.11	1.11	130	A0/A1V	Meridiana (traditionally Alphekka Meridiana, Alfecca Meridiana)
γ CrA A	γ		177474	93825	19^{h} 06^{m} 25.04^{s}	−37° 03′ 45.9″	4.23	2.97	58	F7IV-V	double star 4.97, 4.99 1.6"N.Prec.
δ CrA	δ		177873	94005	19^{h} 08^{m} 20.93^{s}	−40° 29′ 47.9″	4.57	0.93	175	K1III	Qedty
θ CrA	θ		170845	90982	18^{h} 33^{m} 30.16^{s}	−42° 18′ 44.9″	4.62	−2.50	867	G5III	Bie
ζ CrA	ζ		176638	93542	19^{h} 03^{m} 06.83^{s}	−42° 05′ 42.0″	4.74	0.99	184	A0Vn	
ε CrA	ε		175813	93174	18^{h} 58^{m} 43.47^{s}	−37° 06′ 25.5″	4.83	2.45	98	F3IV/V	W UMa variable, V_{max} = 4.74^{m}, V_{min} = 5^{m}, P = 0.5914264 d
HD 165189	(B) (Note: Labelled B Telescopii (B Tel/B Telescopii) by Bode in his Uranographia)		165189	88726	18^{h} 06^{m} 49.88^{s}	−43° 25′ 29.9″	4.92	1.71	143	A5V	mag.is with HD165190 5.68, 1.8"N.
γ CrA B	γ		177475		19^{h} 06^{m} 25.10^{s}	−37° 03′ 48.0″	4.99				component B of γ CrA, 1.6" np 4.23(AB)
HD 168592	(π) (Note: Labelled Pi Telescopii (π Tel/π Telescopii) by Bode in his Uranographia)		168592	90037	18^{h} 22^{m} 18.60^{s}	−38° 39′ 24.6″	5.09	−0.85	503	K4/K5III	Magur
λ CrA	λ		172777	91875	18^{h} 43^{m} 46.94^{s}	−38° 19′ 23.9″	5.11	1.15	202	A0/A1V	suspected variable, ΔV = 0.07^{m}
HD 170642	ξ (Note: Labelled Xi Coronae Australis (ξ CrA/ξ Coronae Australis) by Bode in his Uranographia)		170642	90887	18^{h} 32^{m} 21.31^{s}	−39° 42′ 14.1″	5.16	1.02	220	A3V	
μ CrA	μ		173540	92226	18^{h} 47^{m} 44.60^{s}	−40° 24′ 22.0″	5.20	−0.20	393	G5/G6III	
HD 168905	(σ) (Note: Labelled Sigma Telescopii (σ Tel/σ Telescopii) in Bode’s Uranographia)		168905	90200	18^{h} 24^{m} 18.24^{s}	−44° 06′ 36.7″	5.24	−0.79	524	B2.5Vn	suspected variable
HD 175219	ο (Note: Labelled Omicron Coronae Australis (ο CrA/ο Coronae Australis) by Bode in his Uranographia)		175219	92953	18^{h} 56^{m} 16.97^{s}	−42° 42′ 38.2″	5.35	0.46	310	G6III-IV	
V686 CrA	ι (Note: Labelled Iota Coronae Australis (ι CrA/ι Coronae Australis) by Bode in his Uranographia)	V686	175362	92989	18^{h} 56^{m} 40.49^{s}	−37° 20′ 35.5″	5.36	−0.22	425	B3V	α^{2} CVn variable, V_{max} = 5.25^{m}, V_{min} = 5.41^{m}, P = 7.34 d
HD 172991			172991	91989	18^{h} 44^{m} 57.15^{s}	−39° 41′ 10.2″	5.40	−2.64	1320	K1/K2III+..	
V718 CrA		V718	171967	91494	18^{h} 39^{m} 35.18^{s}	−43° 11′ 08.8″	5.42	−1.58	817	M2III	slow irregular variable
HD 167096			167096	89507	18^{h} 15^{m} 53.39^{s}	−44° 12′ 23.4″	5.45	0.87	268	G8/K0III	
η^{1} CrA	η^{1}		173715	92308	18^{h} 48^{m} 50.47^{s}	−43° 40′ 48.0″	5.46	0.33	347	A2Vn	
V692 CrA		V692	166596	89290	18^{h} 13^{m} 12.70^{s}	−41° 20′ 09.9″	5.47	−3.06	1655	B2.5III	SX Ari variable, ΔV = 0.05^{m}, P = 1.67 d
η^{2} CrA	η^{2}		173861	92382	18^{h} 49^{m} 35.00^{s}	−43° 26′ 02.5″	5.60	−0.75	607	B9IV	
HD 169853			169853	90541	18^{h} 28^{m} 27.11^{s}	−38° 59′ 44.1″	5.63	−0.29	498	A2m...	
κ^{2} CrA	κ^{2}		170868	90968	18^{h} 33^{m} 23.13^{s}	−38° 43′ 33.4″	5.67	−2.94	1716	B9.5	
HD 170521			170521	90842	18^{h} 31^{m} 56.22^{s}	−43° 30′ 26.5″	5.71	−2.20	1244	K2III	
V701 CrA		V701	176723	93552	19^{h} 03^{m} 17.69^{s}	−38° 15′ 11.5″	5.73	1.68	211	F2III/IV	δ Sct variable, V_{max} = 5.69^{m}, V_{min} = 5.73^{m}
HD 166114			166114	89099	18^{h} 11^{m} 05.54^{s}	−41° 21′ 32.5″	5.86	1.28	269	F0Vn	suspected variable
HD 178322			178322	94157	19^{h} 09^{m} 57.65^{s}	−41° 53′ 32.0″	5.86	−1.14	817	B5V	suspected variable
HD 179433			179433	94556	19^{h} 14^{m} 39.52^{s}	−45° 11′ 36.4″	5.91	1.12	296	G8III	
HD 170384	ν (Note: Labelled Nu Coronae Australis (ν CrA/ν Coronae Australis) in Bode’s Uranographia)		170384	90759	18^{h} 31^{m} 02.95^{s}	−41° 54′ 49.5″	6.02	1.55	255	A3V	
HD 177565			177565	93858	19^{h} 06^{m} 52.60^{s}	−37° 48′ 35.2″	6.15	4.98	56	G8V	has a planet (b)
HD 176425			176425	93470	19^{h} 02^{m} 08.50^{s}	−41° 54′ 37.7″	6.21	1.04	352	A0V	
HD 170773			170773	90936	18^{h} 33^{m} 00.85^{s}	−39° 53′ 30.6″	6.22	3.43	118	F5V	
HD 175395	π (Note: Labelled as Pi Coronae Australis (π CrA/π Coronae Australis) by Bode in his Uranographia)		175395	93049	18^{h} 57^{m} 14.31^{s}	−43° 55′ 01.0″	6.27	−0.43	712	B9V	
HD 175529			175529	93074	18^{h} 57^{m} 34.39^{s}	−39° 49′ 23.8″	6.29	2.34	201	A5IV/V	
HD 167756			167756	89726	18^{h} 18^{m} 40.15^{s}	−42° 17′ 18.2″	6.30			B0.5Ia	suspected variable, ΔV = 0.03^{m}
κ^{1} CrA	κ^{1}		170867	90969	18^{h} 33^{m} 23.08^{s}	−38° 43′ 12.0″	6.31	0.43	489	B8	
HD 178628			178628	94243	19^{h} 11^{m} 01.91^{s}	−39° 00′ 16.9″	6.34	−3.19	2629	B7II/III	
HD 169943			169943	90597	18^{h} 29^{m} 12.87^{s}	−43° 50′ 45.6″	6.36	0.38	512	G8III	
HD 176270			176270	93371	19^{h} 01^{m} 04.30^{s}	−37° 03′ 41.4″	6.44	2.00	252	B9.5IV:	
HD 178254			178254	94130	19^{h} 09^{m} 39.76^{s}	−39° 49′ 37.9″	6.44	1.29	350	K0III	
HD 168357			168357	89920	18^{h} 20^{m} 55.19^{s}	−37° 29′ 15.5″	6.46	−2.76	2280	K2II	
HD 174407			174407	92608	18^{h} 52^{m} 11.95^{s}	−41° 42′ 32.8″	6.47	−0.13	682	K3III	
HD 175093			175093	92866	18^{h} 55^{m} 23.55^{s}	−37° 23′ 11.8″	6.48	0.91	424	K1III	
HD 175855			175855	93209	18^{h} 59^{m} 10.97^{s}	−39° 32′ 04.7″	6.49	0.62	486	B9.5V	
HD 174152			174152	92487	18^{h} 50^{m} 58.65^{s}	−41° 03′ 45.6″	6.50	−2.18	1772	B5III	
V693 CrA		V693			18^{h} 41^{m} 57.8^{s}	−37° 31′ 14″	6.50				nova, V_{max} = 6.5^{m}, V_{min} = <19.0^{m}
V394 CrA		V394			18^{h} 00^{m} 25.97^{s}	−39° 00′ 35.1″	7.50				recurrent nova and eclipsing binary, V_{max} = 7.2^{m}, V_{min} = 19.7^{m}, P = 1.515682 d
HD 166473		V694	166473		18^{h} 12^{m} 25.83^{s}	−37° 45′ 09.2″	7.92			A5p	rapidly oscillating Ap star and α^{2} CVn variable
HD 166724			166724	89354	18^{h} 14^{m} 00^{s}	−42° 34′ 31″	9.31		138	K0IV	has a planet (b)
TY CrA		TY			19^{h} 01^{m} 40.83^{s}	−36° 52′ 33.9″	9.39			B8e	Orion and Algol variable, V_{max} = 9.39^{m}, V_{min} = 9.81^{m}, P = 2.8877912 d
V CrA		V	173539	92207	18^{h} 47^{m} 32.31^{s}	−38° 09′ 32.3″	9.40			R...	R Coronae Borealis variable, V_{max} = 9.4^{m}, V_{min} = 17.9^{m}
S CrA		S			19^{h} 01^{m} 08.60^{s}	−36° 57′ 20.0″	10.49			G0Ve+K0Ve	Orion variable in nebula, V_{max} = 10.49^{m}, V_{min} = 13.2^{m}
R CrA		R		93449	19^{h} 01^{m} 53.65^{s}	−36° 57′ 07.6″	11.50		79.64	A5IIev	Orion variable in nebula
T CrA		T			19^{h} 01^{m} 58.78^{s}	−36° 57′ 49.9″	11.67			F0e	Orion variable in nebula, V_{max} = 11.67^{m}, V_{min} = 14.3^{m}
2A 1822-371		V691			18^{h} 25^{m} 46.81^{s}	−37° 06′ 18.6″	15.10				Low-mass X-ray binary (pulsar) and eclipsing binary
RX J1856.5-3754					18^{h} 56^{m} 35.11^{s}	−37° 54′ 30.5″	25.7		400		closest known neutron star to Earth; possible quark star
Y CrA		Y	166813		18^{h} 14^{m} 22.95^{s}	−42° 50′ 32.4″				M6	Z Andromedae variable
RU CrA		RU	180206		19^{h} 17^{m} 23.46^{s}	−39° 36′ 46.40″				[WC3/4]	slow irregular variable; central star of planetary nebula IC 1297
Table legend: • Name = Proper name • B = Bayer designation • F or/and G. = Flamsteed designation or Gould designation • Var = Variable-star designation • HD = Henry Draper Catalogue designation number • HIP = Hipparcos Catalogue designation number • RA = Right ascension for the Epoch/Equinox J2000.0 • Dec = Declination for the Epoch/Equinox J2000.0 • vis. mag. = visual magnitude (m or m_{v}), also known as apparent magnitude • abs. mag. = absolute magnitude (M_{v}) • Dist. (ly) = Distance in light-years from Earth • Sp. class = Spectral class of the star in the stellar classification system • Notes = Common name(s) or alternate name(s); comments; notable properties [for example: multiple star status, range of variability if it is a variable star, exoplanets, etc.]

== See also ==
- List of stars by constellation
