= GJ 1214 =

Star in the constellation Ophiuchus

GJ 1214 / Orkaria
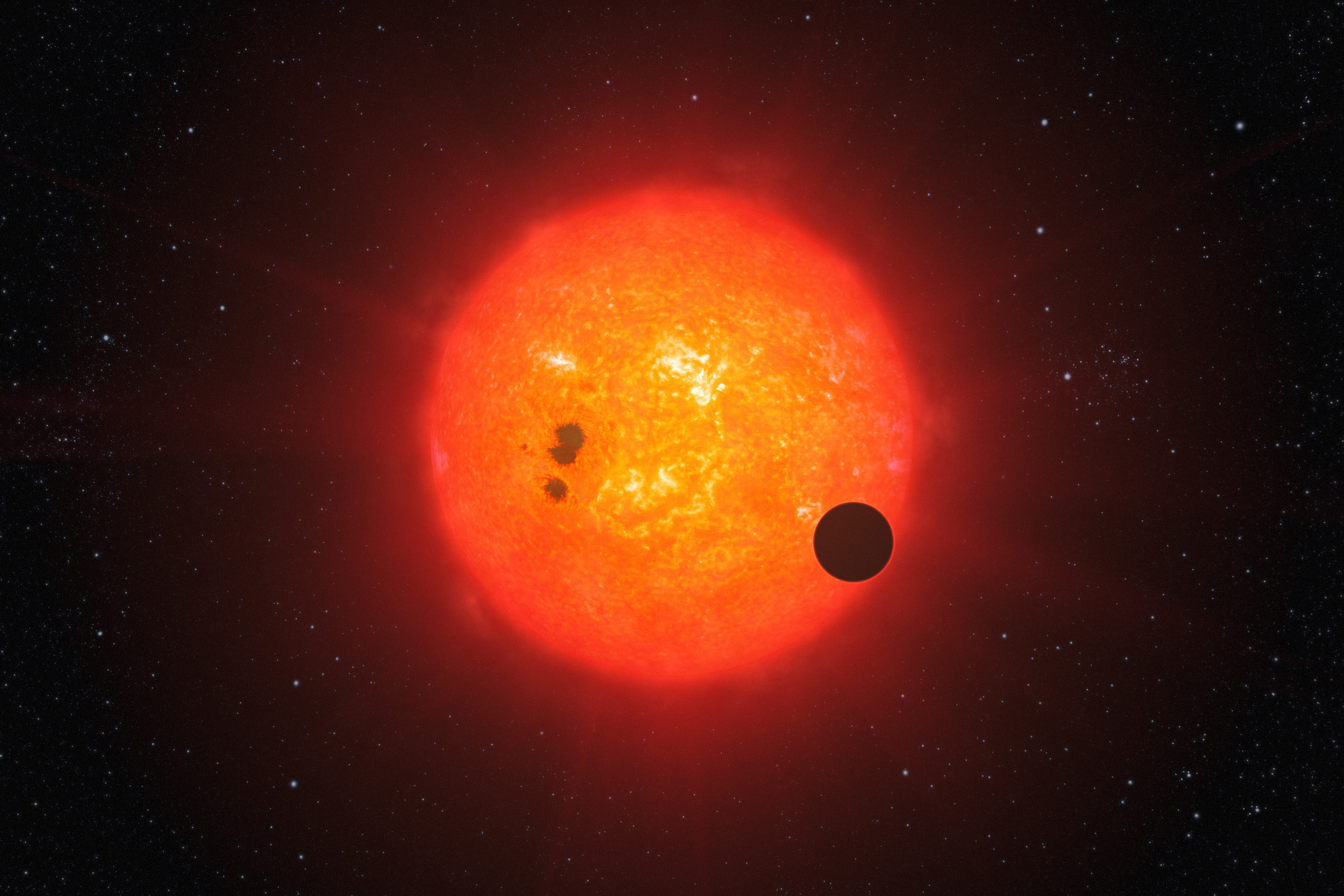
- This artist's impression shows how the super-Earth orbiting the nearby star GJ 1214 may look. Credit: ESO/L. Calçada

Observation data Epoch J2000 Equinox ICRS
- Constellation: Ophiuchus
- Right ascension: 17^{h} 15^{m} 18.93399^{s}
- Declination: +04° 57′ 50.0666″
- Apparent magnitude (V): 14.71±0.03

Characteristics
- Evolutionary stage: main sequence
- Spectral type: M4.5
- Apparent magnitude (B): 16.40
- Apparent magnitude (R): 14.394±0.17
- Apparent magnitude (I): 11.52±0.03
- Apparent magnitude (J): 9.750±0.024
- Apparent magnitude (H): 9.094±0.024
- Apparent magnitude (K): 8.782±0.020
- B−V color index: 1.73
- V−R color index: 0.9
- R−I color index: 2.7
- Variable type: planetary transit

Astrometry
| Radial velocity (R_{v}) | +20.91±0.65 km/s |
| Proper motion (μ) | RA: 580.202 mas/yr Dec.: −749.713 mas/yr |
| Parallax (π) | 68.2986±0.0652 mas |
| Distance | 47.75 ± 0.05 ly (14.64 ± 0.01 pc) |
| Absolute magnitude (M_{V}) | 14.10 |

Details
| Mass | 0.1820+0.0042 −0.0041 M_{☉} |
| Radius | 0.2162+0.0025 −0.0024 R_{☉} |
| Luminosity | 0.00390+0.00021 −0.00020 L_{☉} |
| Surface gravity (log g) | 5.0286+0.0078 −0.0088 cgs |
| Temperature | 3,101±43 K |
| Metallicity [Fe/H] | 0.24±0.11 dex |
| Rotation | 125±5 d |
| Age | 5–10 Gyr |

Other designations
- Orkaria, GJ 1214, G 139-21, LHS 3275, LSPM J1715+0457, NLTT 44431, TIC 467929202, 2MASS J17151894+0457496

Database references
| SIMBAD | data |
| Exoplanet Archive | data |
| ARICNS | data |

GJ 1214 (sometimes Gliese 1214) is a dim M4.5 red dwarf star in the constellation Ophiuchus with an apparent magnitude of 14.7. It is located at a distance of 47.8 light-years (14.7 parsecs) from Earth. GJ 1214 hosts one known exoplanet.

== Nomenclature ==
The designation GJ 1214 comes from the Gliese Catalogue of Nearby Stars. This star was first included in the second edition of the catalogue, published in 1979 by Gliese and Jahreiß, hence the GJ prefix usually used for this star.

In August 2022, this planetary system was included among 20 systems to be named by the third NameExoWorlds project. The approved names, proposed by a team from Kenya, were announced in June 2023. GJ 1214 is formally named Orkaria and its planet is named Enaiposha, after the Maa words for red ochre and for a large body of water, alluding to the color of the star and likely composition of the planet.

== Properties ==
GJ 1214 is about one-fifth the radius of the Sun with a surface temperature estimated to be 3,110 K (2,840 °C; 5,140 °F). Its luminosity is only 0.35% that of the Sun.

The estimate for the stellar radius is 15% larger than predicted by theoretical models. It also shows a 1% intrinsic variability in the near-infrared probably caused by stellar spots. The star is rotating slowly, with a period that is most likely an integer multiple of 53 days. It is probably at least three billion years old and a member of the old thin disk of the Milky Way. Although GJ 1214 has a low to moderate level of magnetic activity, it does undergo flares and is a source of X-ray emission with a base luminosity of 7.4×10^{25} erg s^{−1}. The temperature of the stellar corona is estimated to be about 3.5×10^{6} K.

In 2021–2022, the star is suspected to be in the low-activity phase of its magnetic starspot cycle.

== Planetary system ==
In mid-December 2009, a team of Harvard-Smithsonian astronomers announced the discovery of a companion extrasolar planet, GJ 1214 b, potentially composed largely of water and having the mass and diameter of a super-Earth, though now more often described as a mini-Neptune based on its composition.

Discovered by the MEarth Project and investigated further by the HARPS spectrograph on ESO’s 3.6-metre telescope at La Silla, GJ 1214 b was the second super-Earth exoplanet for which astronomers determined the mass and radius, giving vital clues about its structure. It was also the first super-Earth around which an atmosphere was found. A search for additional planets using transit timing variations was negative.

No transit-time variations have yet been found for this transit. As of 2012, "the given data does not allow us to conclude that there is a [second] planet in the mass range 0.1–5 Earth-masses and the period range 0.76–1.23 or 1.91–3.18 days." The X-ray flux from the host star is estimated to have stripped 2–5.6 M_{🜨} from the planet over the lifetime of the system.

The GJ 1214 planetary system
| Companion (in order from star) | Mass | Semimajor axis (AU) | Orbital period (days) | Eccentricity | Inclination (°) | Radius |
|---|---|---|---|---|---|---|
| b / Enaiposha | 8.41+0.36 −0.35 M_{🜨} | 0.01505±0.00011 | 1.580404531+18 −17 | 0.0062+0.0044 −0.0079 | 88.980+0.094 −0.085 | 2.733+0.033 −0.031 R_{🜨} |

== See also ==
- CoRoT-7
- Gliese 581
- Gliese 876
- List of extrasolar planets
