= LHS 1140 =

Star in the constellation Cetus

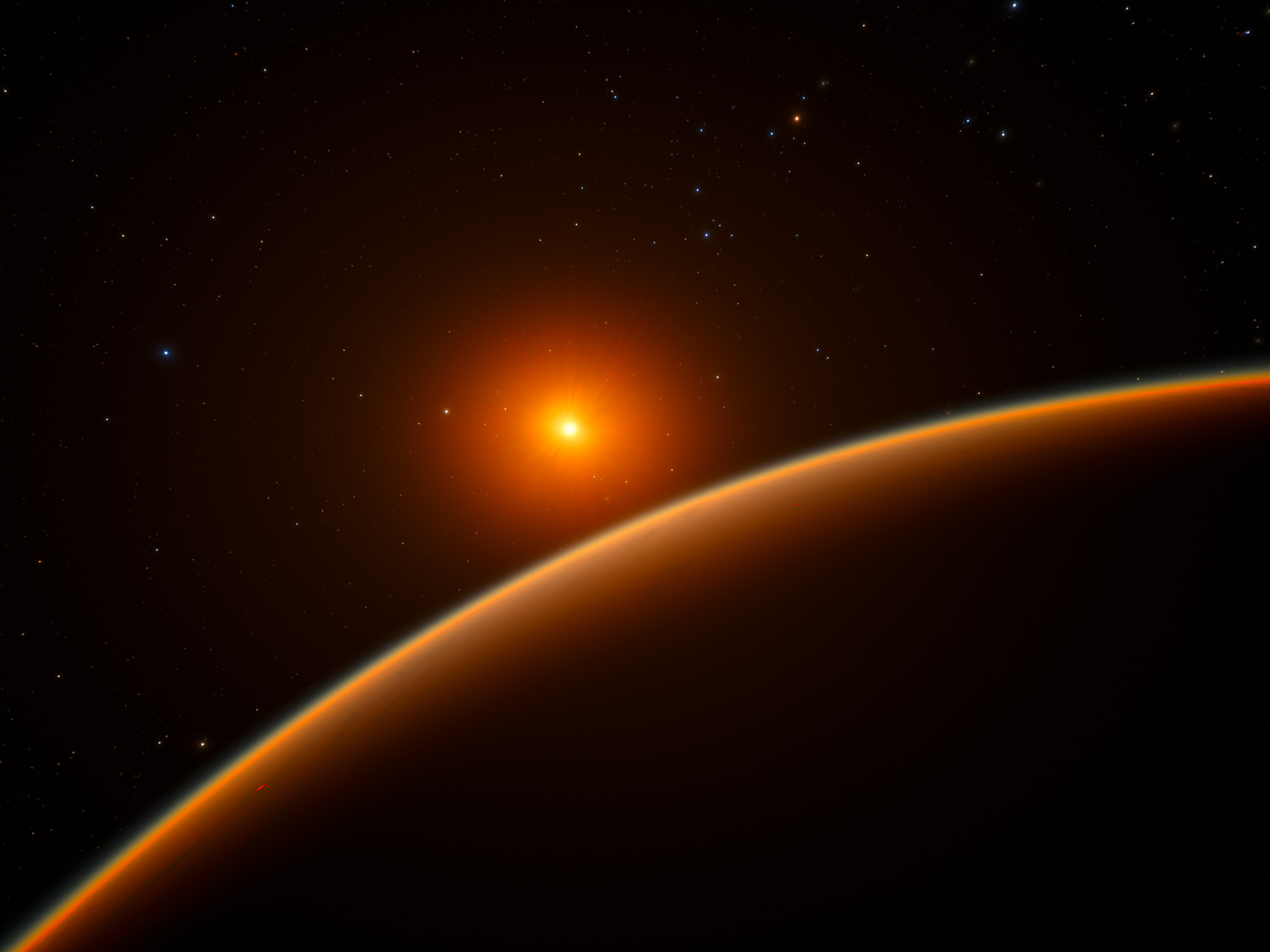
- Artist's impression of LHS 1140 b and its host star.

Observation data Epoch J2000.0 Equinox ICRS
- Constellation: Cetus
- Right ascension: 00^{h} 44^{m} 59.33091^{s}
- Declination: −15° 16′ 17.5428″
- Apparent magnitude (V): 14.18

Characteristics
- Evolutionary stage: Main sequence
- Spectral type: M4.5V

Astrometry
Radial velocity (R_{v})	−13.74±0.42 km/s
Proper motion (μ)	RA: 318.152 mas/yr Dec.: −596.623 mas/yr
Parallax (π)	66.8287±0.0479 mas
Distance	48.80 ± 0.03 ly (14.96 ± 0.01 pc)

Details
Mass	0.1844±0.0045 M_{☉}
Radius	0.2159±0.0030 R_{☉}
Luminosity	0.0038±0.0003 L_{☉}
Surface gravity (log g)	5.041±0.016 cgs
Temperature	3,096±48 K
Metallicity [Fe/H]	−0.15±0.09 dex
Rotation	131±5 d
Age	>5 Gyr

Other designations
- GJ 3053, G 270-58, G 268-38, LHS 1140, NLTT 2465, TOI-256, TIC 92226327, 2MASS J00445930-1516166

Database references
SIMBAD	data
Exoplanet Archive	data
ARICNS	data

LHS 1140 is a red dwarf star in the constellation of Cetus. Based on stellar parallax measurement, it is 48.8 light-years (15.0 parsecs) away from the Sun. 'LHS' refers to the Luyten Half-Second Catalogue of stars with proper motions exceeding half a second of arc annually. The star is over 5 billion years old and has only about 18% the mass of the Sun and 21% of its radius. LHS 1140's rotational period is 130 days. No flares have been observed.

== Planetary system ==
As of October 2023, LHS 1140 is known to have two planets orbiting it. The inner planet is LHS 1140 c, a hot rocky planet; the outer planet, which was the first to be discovered, is LHS 1140 b, a water-rich super-Earth in the habitable zone.

=== LHS 1140 c ===
The existence of LHS 1140 c was first proposed by Feng et al. in July 2018 and confirmed by Ment et al. in August 2018, using the transit method of detection. It has a mass about 1.9 times Earth's and a radius 1.3 times as large, giving it a density of about 5 g/cm^{3}, consistent with a rocky composition. From eclipse observations, its dayside temperature has been measured at 561±44 K, consistent with a low-albedo planet with no atmosphere. The observations rule out pure CO_{2} atmospheres with a pressure ≥10 mbar and pure H_{2}O atmospheres ≥1 bar. This result is similar to other hot rocky planets around red dwarfs, such as LHS 3844 b and TRAPPIST-1b.

=== LHS 1140 b ===
LHS 1140 b was discovered by the MEarth Project in 2017 using the transit method. Follow-up radial velocities were measured by the High Accuracy Radial Velocity Planet Searcher instrument to confirm the planet and measure its mass. The planet LHS 1140 b is a super-Earth in the habitable zone and transits the star every 24.7 days. This allows its atmosphere to be studied: the combination of the transiting super-Earth and the relatively small and nearby host star make this system one of the most promising known for atmosphere studies, along with the TRAPPIST-1 system. Observations by the Hubble Space Telescope in 2020 found signs of water vapor in the planet's atmosphere, but this has not been confirmed. Later observations with the James Webb Space Telescope (JWST) suggest the presence of a nitrogen-rich atmosphere.

LHS 1140 b was initially estimated to be about 7 times Earth's mass and about 1.4 times its radius, suggesting a dense rocky planet. Later studies in 2018 and 2020 revised the radius upwards to about 1.7 times Earth's, giving it a density of about 7.5 g/cm^{3}, still consistent with a rocky composition. However, a 2023 study measuring the planet's mass and radius with greater precision found a lower mass of about 5.6 times Earth's, and a correspondingly lower density, no longer consistent with a rocky planet given the planet's size. LHS 1140 b is likely an ocean planet with 9-19% of its mass composed of water; JWST observations rule out a hydrogen atmosphere, so it is not a mini-Neptune.

=== Search for additional planets ===
In July 2018, Feng et al. published a reanalysis of the radial velocity data for LHS 1140, and proposed the likely existence of two additional planets: an inner Earth-mass planet orbiting every 3.8 days (later confirmed as planet c) and an outer Neptune-mass planet orbiting every 90 days. The orbital period of the outer planet candidate, LHS 1140 d, was refined to 78 days in 2020, but this radial velocity signal was found to originate from stellar activity rather than a planet in 2023.

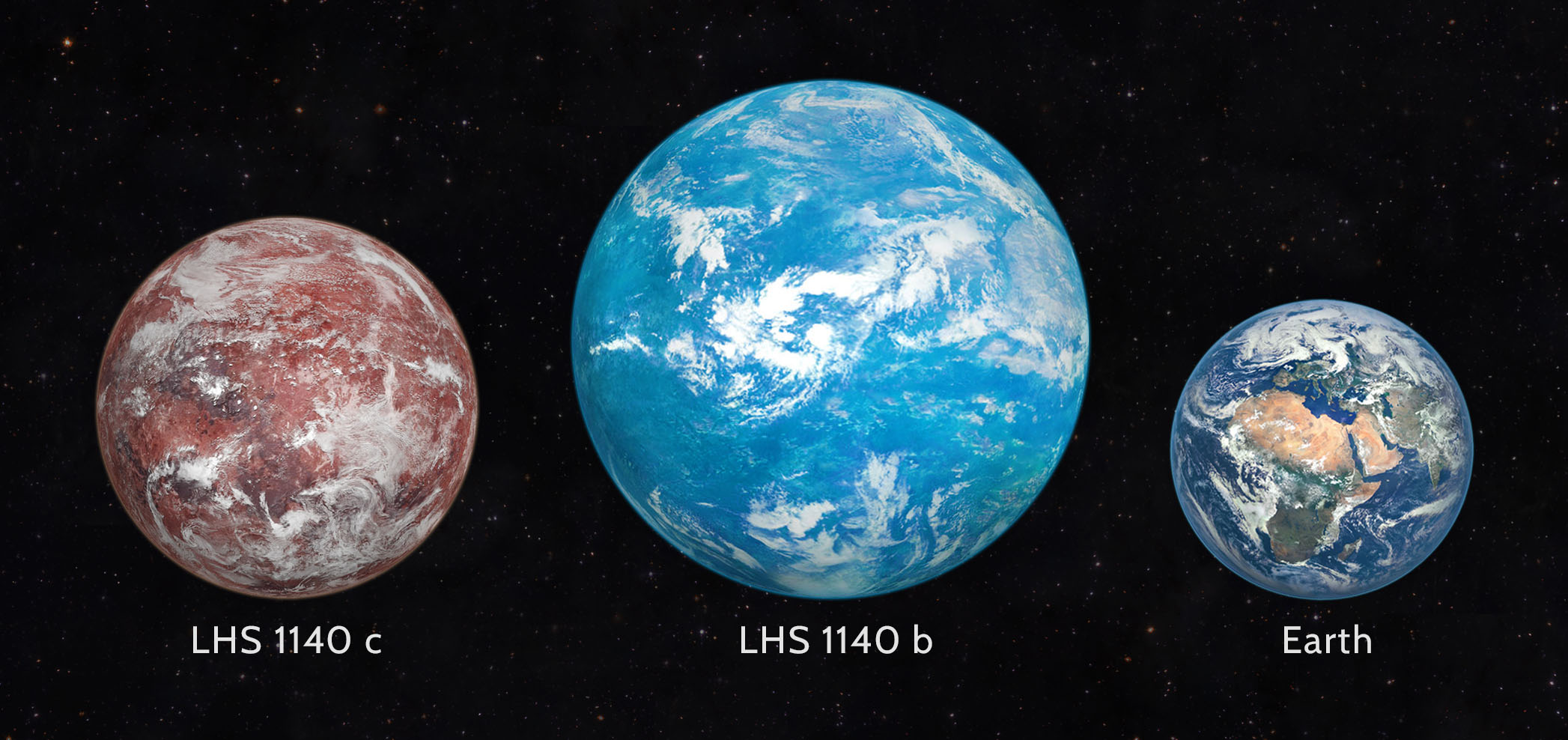
Size comparison of the two known planets of LHS 1140 (artistic concept) with Earth

The LHS 1140 planetary system
Companion (in order from star)	Mass	Semimajor axis (AU)	Orbital period (days)	Eccentricity	Inclination (°)	Radius
c	1.91±0.06 M_{🜨}	0.0270±0.0005	3.777940±0.000002	<0.050	89.80+0.14 −0.19	1.272±0.026 R_{🜨}
b	5.60±0.19 M_{🜨}	0.0946±0.0017	24.73723±0.00002	<0.043	89.86±0.04	1.730±0.025 R_{🜨}

== See also ==
- MEarth Project
- Planetary habitability
- High Accuracy Radial Velocity Planet Searcher (HARPS)
- Super-Earth
- Habitability of red dwarf systems
- GJ 1132 b
- GJ 1214 b
