= Daniel Rouan =

French astrophysicist (born 1950)

Daniel Rouan, born on 21 September 1950, is a French astrophysicist. He is Director of Research Emeritus at the CNRS. He was elected to the French Academy of Sciences in 2005.

== Biography ==
Daniel Rouan, a former student of the École normale supérieure (1970-1974), agrégé de sciences physiques (1974), doctor of science (1982), is Director of Research Emeritus CNRS at LESIA, the space laboratory of the Observatoire de Paris, where he has conducted most of his career.

== Scientific work ==
He focused his instrumental research on the development of infrared astronomy in France, on the ground and in space, and more particularly on high angular resolution and high contrast imaging by contributing to the development of adaptive optics, which corrects the harmful effects of atmospheric turbulence and stellar coronography, which make it possible to mask the light of a star to better distinguish its planetary environment. He is the inventor of the four-quadrant coronograph, installed on several telescope instruments on the ground or in space.

Involved in the development of several space projects (ISO, CoRoT, JWST) or instruments for very large ground-based telescopes (VLT-NAOS, VLT-SPHERE), he uses these techniques to discover and study exoplanets: he is thus co-discoverer of about forty extrasolar planets, including COROT-7b, the first rocky exoplanet detected, as well as the giant planet directly around the star beta Pictoris.

He also studies the physics of the interstellar medium and circumstellar, the regions of intensive star formation and the environment of active galaxy nuclei. In particular at the centre of the Milky Way, as part of an international team, he provided definitive proof of the existence of an ultra-massive black hole 4 million times the mass of the sun.

He founded the concept of Diophantine optics, several versions of which have been tested and validated. He has published more than 470 articles, 215 of which are in range A newspapers and is co-author of several books:

- Léna, Pierre; Rouan, Daniel; Lebrun, François; Mignard, François; Pelat, Didier; Observation in astronomy, Ellipses (2009)
- Publisher of the Astrophysics section of the Encyclopedia of Astrobiology (Springer) - 2010-2018 and of the Exoplanets section of the new edition
- Léna, Pierre; Rouan, Daniel; Lebrun, François; Mignard, François; Pelat, Didier; Mugnier, Laurent; Lyle, Stephen; Observational astrophysics, Springer (2012)
- Editor-in-Chief of Observation of Black holes and extreme gravitational events, Elsevier

== Honours and awards ==
- Camille Flammarion Medal, Société Astronomique de France 1982
- Alexandre Joannidès Prize of the Academy of Sciences 2004
- Elected member of the French Academy of Sciences in 2005
- Vice-President of the La Main à la Pâte Foundation: 2013-2014
- President of the La Main à la Pâte Foundation: since 2014
- Director of the Doctoral School of Astronomy-Astrophysics of Île-de-France: 2008- 2013
- Member of the jury of various prizes (Joliot-Curie, Academy of Sciences, Research,...)
- Chevalier of the Légion d'Honneur, July 14, 2019
