= CoRoT-7c =

Extrasolar planet

Discovery
- Discovered by: Queloz et al.
- Discovery site: La Silla Observatory, Chile
- Discovery date: August 24, 2009
- Detection method: Radial Velocity (HARPS)

Orbital characteristics
- Semi-major axis: 0.046 AU (6,900,000 km)
- Eccentricity: 0
- Orbital period (sidereal): 3.698 ± 0.003 d
- Semi-amplitude: unknown
- Star: CoRoT-7

Physical characteristics
- Mass: 13.289±0.689 M_{🜨}

CoRoT-7c is an extrasolar planet which orbits the G-type main sequence star CoRoT-7, located approximately 489 light years away in the constellation Monoceros. It is either a super-Earth or a Neptune-like planet, orbiting at 0.046 AU from the star, taking 3.7 days or 89 hours to make one round trip around the star.

== Discovery ==
The discovery of the planet was announced in February 2009, during the First Corot Symposium. It was discovered during the follow-up started in order to confirm the existence of CoRoT-7b, a super-Earth uncovered by the CoRoT mission. However, unlike CoRoT-7b, it was not detected by the transit method from the CoRoT satellite, but only by the radial velocity method using HARPS from La Silla Observatory, Chile. A posteriori search of transits of CoRoT-7c in the lightcurve of the star CoRoT-7 yielded a negative result, confirming the planet is not transiting. As a consequence no radius measurement is available, and no density and structure models of the planet can be established.

== Characteristics ==
Like CoRoT-7b, the mass of CoRoT-7c is weakly constrained, since the radial velocity data is noisy due to the presence of stellar activity. Published mass measurements range from 8.4 Earth masses to 13.5 Earth masses, passing through 12.4 Earth masses and 13.1 Earth masses. This mass range encompasses the Super-Earths to Neptunes transition, so the nature of CoRoT-7c, either a rocky planet or an ice giant, remains unclear. However, if the larger mass estimates are correct, CoRoT-7c is probably a hot Uranus-like planet. Chances are high that planet's rotation is tidally locked to the orbital period, with one side of the planet always facing the star CoRoT-7 and the other one in permanent darkness.

A third planet, CoRoT-7d, is present in the system. Strong mutual gravitational forces could be exchanged between these planets, leading to powerful tidal forces.

== Doubts about existence ==
A published study cast doubt on CoRoT-7c's existence, arguing that the combined presence of stellar activity and additional errors on HARPS radial velocity measurements preclude a meaningful search for additional companions besides CoRoT-7b. However, all the other studies seem to confirm the planet's existence: the signal in the HARPS data of CoRoT-7c is detected in analysis of different type, does not seem to be correlated with stellar activity and is stronger than the signal associated with the confirmed CoRoT-7b. The remarkable stability and precision showed by the HARPS spectrograph also speaks in favour of the detection. The status of CoRoT-7c seems very well confirmed.
