= LHS 1140 b =

Super-Earth orbiting LHS 1140

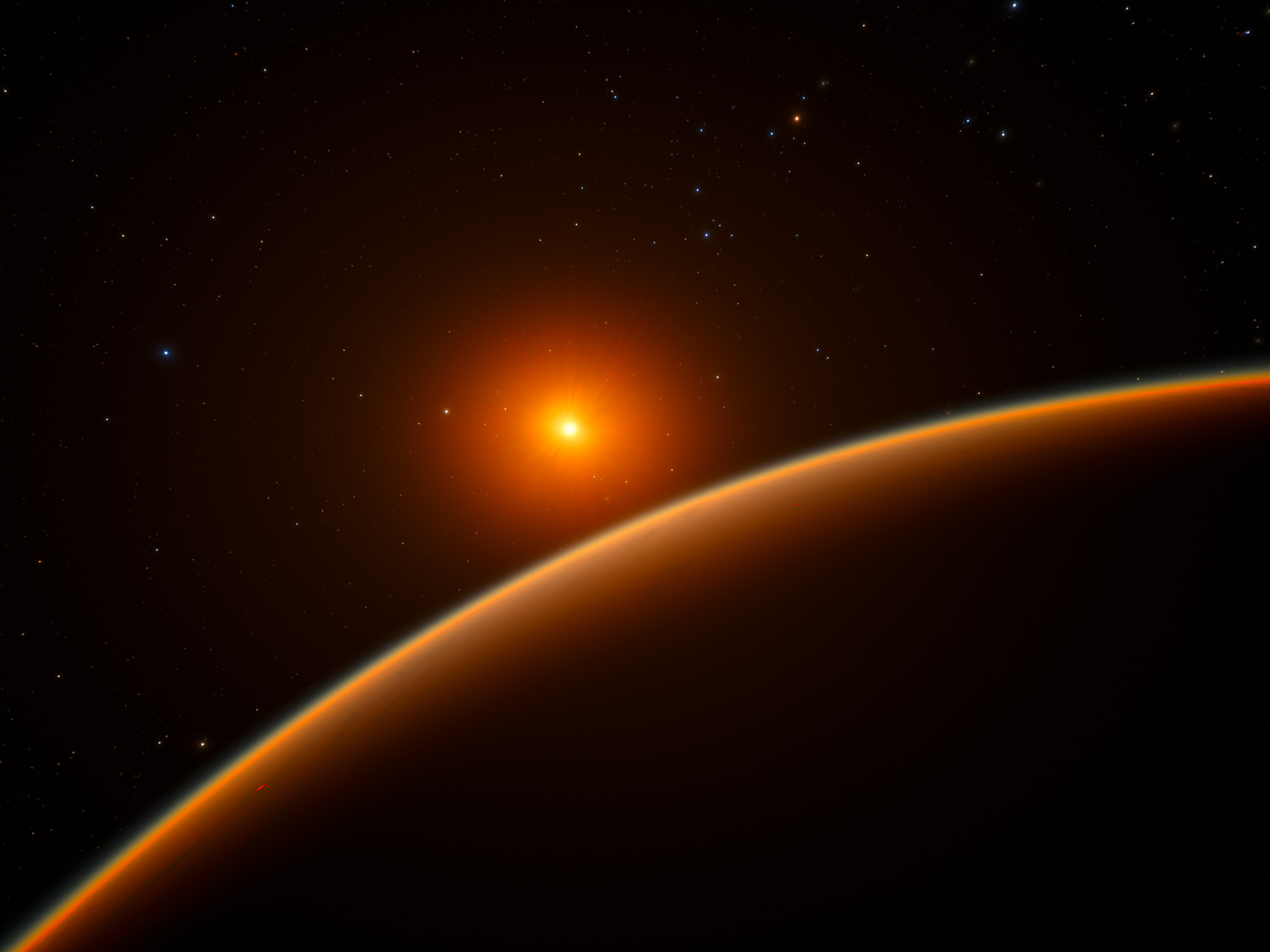
- Artist's impression of the exoplanet LHS 1140 b and its host star

Discovery
- Discovered by: MEarth Project
- Discovery date: 20 April 2017 (Published)
- Detection method: Transit

Orbital characteristics
- Semi-major axis: 0.0946±0.0017 AU
- Eccentricity: <0.043
- Orbital period (sidereal): 24.7369148±0.0000058 d
- Inclination: 89.86°±0.04°
- Star: LHS 1140

Physical characteristics
- Mean radius: 1.730±0.025 R_{🜨}
- Mass: 5.60±0.19 M_{🜨}
- Mean density: 5.9±0.3 g/cm^{3}
- Temperature: 226±4 K (−47 °C; −53 °F, equilibrium)

LHS 1140 b is an exoplanet orbiting within the conservative habitable zone of the red dwarf star LHS 1140. Discovered in 2017 by the MEarth Project, LHS 1140 b is about 5.6 times the mass of Earth and about 70% larger in radius, putting it within the super-Earth category of planets. It was initially thought to be a dense rocky planet, but refined measurements of its mass and radius have found a lower density than previously estimated, indicating that it is likely an ocean planet with 9-19% of its mass composed of water. LHS 1140 b orbits entirely within the star's habitable zone and gets 43% the incident flux of Earth. The planet is 49 light-years (15 parsecs) away and transits its star, making it an excellent candidate for atmospheric studies with ground-based and/or space telescopes. Near-infrared ground-based spectroscopic observations have suggested the presence of an atmosphere containing helium. If this is true, this would be the first detection of atmosphere around a relatively rocky exoplanet in the habitable zone. However, observations with JWST have not detected any atmospheric helium.

== Host star ==
LHS 1140 b orbits a star named LHS 1140. It is 18.4% the mass and 21.6% the radius of the Sun with a spectral type of M4.5V. The temperature of LHS 1140 is 3,096 K (2,823 °C; 5,113 °F), and it has a luminosity of 0.0038 times that of the Sun. It is at least 5 billion years old. For comparison, the Sun is 1 solar mass and radius, has a temperature of 5,778 K (5,505 °C; 9,941 °F) with 1 solar luminosity, is 4.5 billion years old, and has the spectral type of G2V. In addition, LHS 1140 is a very inactive star, with no major flare events found by the discovery team of its planet. Unlike most stars its size, LHS 1140 has low amounts of activity and rotates every 130 days.

== Characteristics ==
=== Mass and radius ===
LHS 1140 b has been detected using both the radial velocity method (which measures the mass of a companion object) and transit photometry (which determines radius). Because of this, LHS 1140 b is one of very few potentially habitable exoplanets with a determined mass and radius, the others all being those around TRAPPIST-1. The planet's radius is well-constrained at 1.730±0.025 R_{🜨}, equivalent to about 11,000 km. Its radius is similar to that of Kepler-62e.

A recent study from 2023 reevaluates the mass and radius of LHS 1140 b, finding a mass of 5.60±0.19 M_{🜨} and a radius of 1.730±0.025 R_{🜨}, less massive and larger than previous estimates. This would make LHS 1140 b an ocean world or dense mini-Neptune rather than a terrestrial planet.

=== Orbit and temperature ===
The orbit of LHS 1140 b takes 24.737 days to complete, much quicker than Earth's year of 365 days. Its orbital radius is at 0.0946 AU, or 9.46% the distance between Earth and the Sun. While this is quite close, the star LHS 1140 is so dim that the planet only gets 0.43 times the incident flux of Earth at this distance. Assuming an albedo of 0, LHS 1140 b has an equilibrium temperature of 230 K (−43 °C; −46 °F), compared to Earth's at 255 K (−18 °C; −1 °F). If LHS 1140 b has an albedo similar to that of Earth, the equilibrium temperature would be even lower, at 201 K (−72 °C; −98 °F). However, with a greenhouse effect at least as strong as Earth's LHS 1140 b would have a surface temperature greater than 266 K (−7 °C; 19 °F) for an albedo of 0. Due to the high mass of the planet, it likely has a thicker atmosphere with a more powerful greenhouse effect. Like many potentially habitable planets around red dwarfs, the orbit of LHS 1140 b is quite circular: the eccentricity is measured to be lower than 0.29 to a 90% confidence. The circularization of the orbit cannot be explained by stellar tides, and thus the circularity of the orbit is likely to be natal.

=== Composition ===
Initially the planet was believed to have an extremely high density around 12.5 g/cm^{3}, one of the highest ever observed for a rocky planet and over twice the density of Earth, with an iron-nickel core taking up to 75% of the planet's total mass. Later studies in 2018 and 2020 revised the planet's radius upwards, giving it a density of 7.82+0.98
−0.88 g/cm^{3}, still consistent with a rocky composition, and a lower core mass fraction of 49±7%. For comparison, Earth's core comprises about 32.5% of its mass. The 2020 study also suggests that about 4% of the planet's mass is composed of water, suggesting it could be an ocean world estimated to have an average ocean depth of 779±650 km.

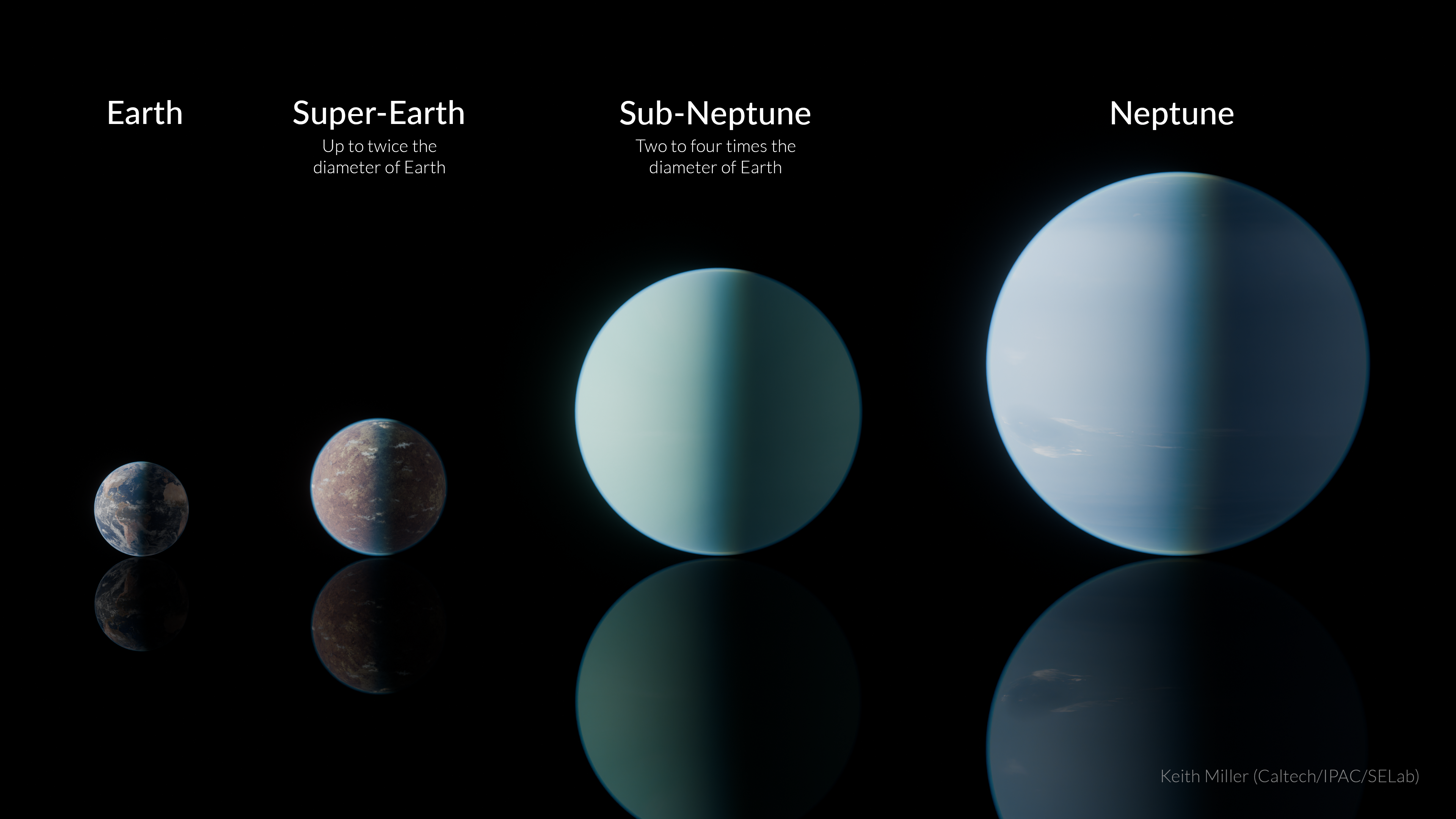
Size comparison of a typical super-Earth (middle left) and sub-Neptune (middle right) compared to Earth and Neptune. Super-Earths and sub-Neptunes are the most common types of exoplanet.

A 2023 study measuring the planet's mass and radius with greater precision found a lower mass of about 5.6 times Earth's, and a correspondingly lower density, no longer consistent with a rocky planet given the planet's size. LHS 1140 b is likely an ocean world with an even greater water mass fraction of 9-19%, or a dense mini-Neptune. JWST observations rule out a hydrogen-rich atmosphere, supporting the ocean world scenario.

=== Atmosphere ===
A potential detection of water vapor in the atmosphere of LHS 1140 b was made in late 2020 with the Hubble Space Telescope, albeit at a low signal-to-noise ratio. Observations by the James Webb Space Telescope (JWST) published in 2024 rule out a hydrogen-rich atmosphere and support a high mean molecular weight atmosphere, possibly consisting of nitrogen, water vapor, and carbon dioxide. In July 2024, tentative hints of atmospheric nitrogen were detected by JWST, suggesting that the surface of the planet might be mostly ice and partially covered in liquid water, which resembles an eyeball. If this detection could be verified, it would be the first evidence of a secondary atmosphere around a potentially habitable exoplanet.

In July 2026, a team of astronomers reported a detection of helium escaping from the exoplanet's upper atmosphere, based on transit spectroscopy with the Magellan Clay Telescope at Las Campanas Observatory. During a 6.5-hour observation on September 2024 that captured transits of both LHS 1140 b and LHS 1140 c, the team measured an excess absorption feature consistent with helium during LHS 1140 b's transit, interpreted as a hydrodynamic atmospheric outflow driven by stellar X-ray and extreme-ultraviolet heating. The result was described as the first evidence of a retained atmosphere on a relatively rocky exoplanet within a star's habitable zone. An observation in 2025 showed no helium absorption, indicating the atmospheric escape is time-variable; modeling suggested this non-detection is consistent with lower stellar activity rather than a contradictory result. The findings suggested an upper atmosphere dominated by helium and depleted in hydrogen, with heavier volatiles such as water potentially cold-trapped at lower altitudes. No helium absorption was detected for the neighboring planet LHS 1140 c, consistent with its position on the opposite side of the proposed "cosmic shoreline" that separates planets that retain atmospheres from those that lose them. However, other observations from JWST made between 2023 and 2026 failed to detect any helium in the atmosphere of LHS 1140 b and found no evidence for any atmospheric mass loss.

== Habitability ==
LHS 1140 b orbits close to the outer edge of the habitable zone, a region around a star where temperatures are just right for liquid water to pool on the surface of orbiting planets, given sufficient atmospheric pressure. The equilibrium temperature of LHS 1140 b is rather low, at 230 K (−43 °C; −46 °F), as cold as the polar regions on Earth. However, this is the calculated temperature excluding the impact of a thick atmosphere. With an Earth-like greenhouse effect, the surface temperature is about 266 K (−7 °C; 19 °F), but since the planet is so massive, the greenhouse effect may be even higher. At twice the greenhouse effect of Earth, LHS 1140 b would have a comfortable surface temperature of 296 K (23 °C; 73 °F). In addition, the host star is so inactive that atmospheric erosion will not be very high, suggesting the planet should be able to retain its atmosphere over long timescales. If no atmosphere is present, LHS 1140 b is likely to be covered by a thin ice envelope. In this case, it could receive enough radiogenic heating and tidal heating for significant amounts of liquid water to be transported through the ice shell to its surface via cryovolcanic venting of water-rich geysers.

== See also ==
- Nearby potentially habitable exoplanets
  - Proxima Centauri b
  - Ross 128 b
  - Luyten b
  - TRAPPIST-1d
  - TRAPPIST-1e
  - TRAPPIST-1f
  - TRAPPIST-1g
- K2-3d, a low-density planet near the habitable zone
- Kepler-1652b, a potentially habitable super-Earth
- Habitability of red dwarf systems
- List of potentially habitable exoplanets
- List of terrestrial exoplanet candidates for atmosphere detection
