= HD 177565 b =

Hot Neptune orbiting HD 177565

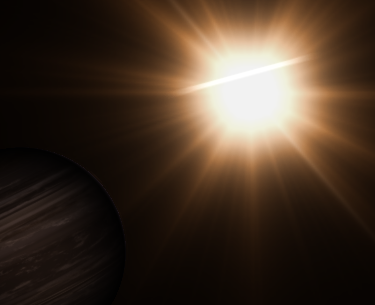
- An artist's impression of HD 177565 b orbiting its host star.

Discovery
- Discovered by: Feng, F. et al.
- Discovery site: La Silla Observatory
- Discovery date: May 10, 2017

Orbital characteristics
- Periastron: 0.187 AU (28,000,000 km)
- Apoastron: 0.305 AU (45,600,000 km)
- Semi-major axis: 0.246 ± 0.019 AU (36,800,000 ± 2,800,000 km)
- Eccentricity: 0.059300^{+0.17170}_{−0.05745}
- Orbital period (sidereal): 44.505+0.586 −0.293 d
- Argument of periastron: 310°+46° −306°
- Semi-amplitude: 2.71+1.12 −0.99 km/s
- Star: HD 177565

Physical characteristics
- Mass: ≥15.10+6.40 −6.05 M_{🜨}
- Temperature: 539 K (266 °C; 511 °F)

HD 177565 b is an extrasolar planet orbiting the G-type main-sequence star HD 177565 55.3 light-years away from the Solar System.

== Nomenclature ==
The planet gets its name from its host star's Henry Draper Catalogue designation, HD 177565 and the "b" designation from being the first exoplanet detected in the system.

== Discovery ==
HD 177565 b was discovered by astronomer F. Feng and colleagues at the La Silla Observatory on May 10, 2017 by using doppler spectroscopy measurements from the High Accuracy Radial Velocity Planet Searcher spectrograph. Combining the radial velocity measurements from HD 177565 & HD 41248 and periodograms via the Athaga tool, the team was able to derive orbits for this planet and HD 41248 b and c.

== Properties ==
Since the planet was detected indirectly, its physical properties such as its radius and density cannot be observed. HD 177565 b takes 44.5 days to complete a relatively circular orbit at a separation of 0.246 AU, which is slightly lower compared to the planet Mercury's distance from the Sun. Its inclination and hence its true mass are also currently immeasurable, so only the minimum mass can be determined. HD 177565 b has a minimum mass 15.1 times the mass of Earth, making it a hot Neptune; it has an equilibrium temperature of 539 K.

== See also ==
- CoRoT-7b
