= HD 170642 =

A-type dwarf; Corona Australis

- Location of HD 170642 (circled)

Observation data Epoch J2000.0 Equinox ICRS
- Constellation: Corona Australis
- Right ascension: 18^{h} 32^{m} 21.33140^{s}
- Declination: −39° 42′ 14.4023″
- Apparent magnitude (V): 5.16±0.01

Characteristics
- Spectral type: A3 V or A3 Van
- B−V color index: +0.08

Astrometry
| Radial velocity (R_{v}) | −6±4.2 km/s |
| Proper motion (μ) | RA: +32.47 mas/yr Dec.: −37.47 mas/yr |
| Parallax (π) | 14.23±0.23 mas |
| Distance | 229 ± 4 ly (70 ± 1 pc) |
| Absolute magnitude (M_{V}) | +0.93 |

Details
| Mass | 2.25 M_{☉} |
| Radius | 2.59±0.13 R_{☉} |
| Luminosity | 32.6 L_{☉} |
| Surface gravity (log g) | 3.96 cgs |
| Temperature | 8,938±161 K |
| Metallicity [Fe/H] | +0.24 dex |
| Rotational velocity (v sin i) | 177±1 km/s |
| Age | 480 Myr |

Other designations
- 13 G. Coronae Australis, CD−39°12696, CPD−39°8114, GC 25285, HD 170642, HIP 90887, HR 6942, SAO 210277

Database references
| SIMBAD | data |

HD 170642, also designated as HR 6942 or rarely 13 G. Coronae Australis, is a single star located in the southern constellation Corona Australis. It is faintly visible to the naked eye as a white hued star with an apparent magnitude of 5.16. The object is located relatively close at a distance of 229 light years based on Hipparcos parallax measurements, but it is approaching the Solar System with a somewhat constrained heliocentric radial velocity of −6 km/s. At its current distance, HD 170642's brightness is diminished by 0.28 magnitudes due to interstellar dust. It has an absolute magnitude of +0.93.

This is an ordinary A-type main-sequence star with a stellar classification of A3 V. Other sources include broad/nebulous absorption lines due to rapid rotation. It has 2.25 times the mass of the Sun and is estimated to be 480 million years old. HD 170642 has a radius of 2.59 R_{☉}. When combined with an effective temperature of 8,938 K, it radiates 32.6 times the luminosity of the Sun from its photosphere. The star is metal enriched, having an iron abundance 74% greater than the Sun's. Like many hot stars HD 170642 spins rapidly, having a projected rotational velocity of 177 km/s.
