= HR 6875 =

Star in the constellation Corona Australis

- Location of HR 6875 (circled in red)

Observation data Epoch J2000 Equinox ICRS
- Constellation: Corona Australis
- Right ascension: 18^{h} 24^{m} 18.23949^{s}
- Declination: −44° 06′ 36.9186″
- Apparent magnitude (V): 5.24

Characteristics
- Evolutionary stage: main sequence
- Spectral type: B3 V
- B−V color index: −0.163±0.004

Astrometry
Radial velocity (R_{v})	+0.00±7.40 km/s
Proper motion (μ)	RA: −1.659 mas/yr Dec.: −22,022 mas/yr
Parallax (π)	5.5671±0.1134 mas
Distance	590 ± 10 ly (180 ± 4 pc)
Absolute magnitude (M_{V})	−0.63

Details
Mass	4.5 M_{☉}
Radius	3.9 R_{☉}
Luminosity	389 L_{☉}
Surface gravity (log g)	4.43 cgs
Temperature	15,803 K
Rotation	27.2 days
Rotational velocity (v sin i)	248±12 km/s
Age	103 Myr

Other designations
- CD−44°12569, FK5 3461, HD 168905, HIP 90200, HR 6875, SAO 228982, WDS J18243-4407A

Database references
SIMBAD	data

HR 6875, previously known as Sigma Telescopii, is a single star in the constellation Corona Australis. It has a blue-white hue and is dimly visible to the naked eye with an apparent visual magnitude of 5.24. This object is located at a distance of approximately 590 light years from the Sun based on parallax. It is listed as a member of the Sco OB2 association.

This is a hot B-type main-sequence star with a stellar classification of B3 V. It is around 103 million years old and is spinning rapidly with a projected rotational velocity of 248 km/s or perhaps higher. The star has 4.5 times the mass of the Sun and about four times the Sun's radius. It is radiating nearly 400 the luminosity of the Sun from its photosphere at an effective temperature of 15,803 K

A magnitude 10.13 visual companion is located at an angular separation of 74″ along a position angle of 162°.
