= HD 179433 =

G-type giant; Corona Australis

- Location of HD 179433 (circled)

Observation data Epoch J2000.0 Equinox ICRS
- Constellation: Corona Australis
- Right ascension: 19^{h} 14^{m} 39.56095^{s}
- Declination: −45° 11′ 36.6990″
- Apparent magnitude (V): 5.91±0.01

Characteristics
- Spectral type: G8 III
- B−V color index: +0.90

Astrometry
Radial velocity (R_{v})	−35.1±0.4 km/s
Proper motion (μ)	RA: +47.604 mas/yr Dec.: −39.804 mas/yr
Parallax (π)	9.9058±0.0428 mas
Distance	329 ± 1 ly (101.0 ± 0.4 pc)
Absolute magnitude (M_{V})	+1.11

Details
Mass	2.45±0.04 M_{☉}
Radius	8.26±0.14 R_{☉}
Luminosity	43.3±1.0 L_{☉}
Surface gravity (log g)	2.88±0.07 cgs
Temperature	5,120±30 K
Metallicity [Fe/H]	−0.004±0.027 dex
Rotational velocity (v sin i)	2.9±1 km/s
Age	727±10 Myr

Other designations
- 49 G. Coronae Australis, CD−45°13054, CPD−45°9650, GC 26485, HD 179433, HIP 94556, HR 7281, SAO 229573

Database references
SIMBAD	data

HD 179433, also known as HR 7281 or rarely 49 G. Coronae Australis, is a solitary star located in the southern constellation Corona Australis. It is faintly visible to the naked eye as a yellow-hued point of light with an apparent magnitude of 5.91. Gaia DR3 parallax measurements imply a distance of 329 light-years, and it is currently drifting closer with a heliocentric radial velocity of −35.1 km/s. At its current distance, HD 179433's brightness is diminished by interstellar extinction of 0.22 magnitudes and it has an absolute magnitude of +1.11.

HD 179433 has a stellar classification of G8 III, indicating that it is an evolved red giant. It has 2.45 times the mass of the Sun but at the age of 727 million years, it has expanded to 8.26 times the Sun's radius. It radiates 43.3 times the luminosity of the Sun from its enlarged photosphere at an effective temperature of 5,120 K. HD 197433 has a near solar metallicity at [Fe/H]= −0.0004 and it spins modestly with a projected rotational velocity of 2.9 km/s.
