= HD 178322 =

Spectroscopic binary; Corona Australis

- Location of HD 178322 (circled)

Observation data Epoch J2000.0 Equinox ICRS
- Constellation: Corona Australis
- Right ascension: 19^{h} 09^{m} 57.65200^{s}
- Declination: −41° 53′ 32.0836″
- Apparent magnitude (V): 5.86±0.01

Characteristics
- Spectral type: B5 V + B6 V
- U−B color index: −0.49
- B−V color index: −0.08
- Variable type: suspected

Astrometry
Radial velocity (R_{v})	13.3±2 km/s
Proper motion (μ)	RA: −0.360 mas/yr Dec.: −10.096 mas/yr
Parallax (π)	2.104±0.1145 mas
Distance	1,550 ± 80 ly (480 ± 30 pc)
Absolute magnitude (M_{V})	−2.31 (combined)

Orbit
Primary	A
Name	B
Period (P)	12.4700 d
Semi-major axis (a)	0.235 AU
Eccentricity (e)	0.05
Inclination (i)	71.19°
Periastron epoch (T)	2,438,237.4500 JD
Argument of periastron (ω) (secondary)	199.1°
Argument of periastron (ω) (primary)	19.10°
Semi-amplitude (K_{1}) (primary)	79.70 km/s
Semi-amplitude (K_{2}) (secondary)	78.90 km/s

Details
Age	50.1±8.4 Myr

A
Mass	4.39 M_{☉}
Radius	3.26 R_{☉}
Luminosity	11,749 L_{☉}
Temperature	15,488 K
Rotational velocity (v sin i)	45 km/s

B
Mass	4.35 M_{☉}
Radius	3.07 R_{☉}
Luminosity	513 L_{☉}
Temperature	14,454 K
Rotational velocity (v sin i)	45±7 km/s

Other designations
- 45 G. Coronae Australis, CD−42°13933, CPD−42°8616, GC 26375, HD 178322, HIP 94157, HR 7257, SAO 229531

Database references
SIMBAD	data

HD 178322, also known as HR 7257 or rarely 45 G. Coronae Australis, is a double-lined spectroscopic binary located in the southern constellation Corona Australis. It has a combined apparent magnitude of 5.86, making it faintly visible to the naked eye under ideal conditions. The system is located relatively far at a distance of roughly 1,550 light-years based on Gaia DR3 parallax measurements, and it is currently receding with a heliocentric radial velocity of 13.3 km/s. At its current distance, HD 178322's brightness is diminished by an extinction of 0.28 magnitudes and it has an absolute magnitude of −2.31. The system has a high peculiar velocity of 28.9+4.1
−7.9 km/s, indicating that it may be a runaway star system; it is said to be part of the Scorpius-Centaurus Association.

The components of HD 178322 are both B-type main-sequence stars with stellar classifications of B5 V and B6 V respectively. Both stars have roughly 4.4 times the mass of the Sun and they spin moderately with projected rotational velocities of 45 km/s. The primary has 3.26 times the radius of the Sun and it radiates 11,749 times the luminosity of the Sun from its photosphere at an effective temperature of 15,488 K. The companion has 3.07 times the Sun's girth and it radiates 513 times the luminosity of the Sun from its photosphere at an effective temperature of 14,454 K. Both stars take roughly 12 days to complete a relatively circular orbit at a separation of 0.235 AU. The system is estimated to be 50 million years old.
