= HD 167096 =

Binary star; Corona Australis

- Location of HD 167096 (circled)

Observation data Epoch J2000.0 Equinox J2000.0 (ICRS)
- Constellation: Corona Australis
- Right ascension: 18^{h} 15^{m} 53.45211^{s}
- Declination: −44° 12′ 23.2322″
- Apparent magnitude (V): 5.45±0.01

Characteristics
- Spectral type: G8/K0 III
- B−V color index: +0.96

Astrometry
Radial velocity (R_{v})	−27±13.7 km/s
Proper motion (μ)	RA: +67.283 mas/yr Dec.: +12.211 mas/yr
Parallax (π)	14.5746±0.4724 mas
Distance	224 ± 7 ly (69 ± 2 pc)
Absolute magnitude (M_{V})	+0.64

Orbit
Period (P)	1.811595±0.102779 yr
Semi-major axis (a)	8.1±0.9 mas
Eccentricity (e)	0.00

Details

A
Mass	1.11±0.51 M_{☉}
Radius	8.92±0.45 R_{☉}
Luminosity	32.4±0.7 L_{☉}
Surface gravity (log g)	2.51±0.46 cgs
Temperature	4,886±123 K
Metallicity [Fe/H]	−0.02 dex
Rotational velocity (v sin i)	<1.6 km/s

Other designations
- 4 G. Coronae Australis, CD−44°12456, CPD−44°9034, GC 24892, HD 167096, HIP 89507, HR 6818, SAO 228854, WDS 18159-4412

Database references
SIMBAD	data

HD 167096, also known as HR 6818 or rarely 4 G. Coronae Australis, is a binary star located in the southern constellation Corona Australis. It has an apparent magnitude of 5.45, making it faintly visible to the naked eye. The system is located relatively close at a distance of 224 light years based on Gaia DR3 parallax measurements but is drifting closer with a poorly constrained heliocentric radial velocity of −27 km/s. At its current distance HD 167096's brightness is diminished by three tenths of a magnitudes due to interstellar dust and it has an absolute magnitude of +0.64.

The primary has a stellar classification of G8/K0 III, indicating that it is an evolved red giant with the characteristics of a G8 and K0 giant star. It has 1.11 times the mass of the Sun but it has expanded to 8.92 times the Sun's radius. It radiates 32.4 times the luminosity of the Sun from its enlarged photosphere at an effective temperature of 4,886 K, giving it an orangish-yellow hue. It has a near solar metallicity at [Fe/H] = −0.02 and spins too slowly for its projected rotational velocity to be measured accurately. This is a binary star that completes a circular orbit within 1.81 years. Since the two components have a separation of only 8.1 mas, it makes it difficult to measure their individual properties.
