= HD 177565 =

G-dwarf star w. a planet; Corona Australis

- Location of HD 177565 (circled)

Observation data Epoch J2000.0 Equinox ICRS
- Constellation: Corona Australis
- Right ascension: 19^{h} 06^{m} 52.46439^{s}
- Declination: −37° 48′ 38.3734″
- Apparent magnitude (V): 6.16

Characteristics
- Evolutionary stage: main sequence
- Spectral type: G6 V
- U−B color index: +0.27
- B−V color index: +0.70

Astrometry
| Radial velocity (R_{v}) | 60.9±0.8 km/s |
| Proper motion (μ) | RA: −187.700 mas/yr Dec.: −367.009 mas/yr |
| Parallax (π) | 58.9860±0.0376 mas |
| Distance | 55.29 ± 0.04 ly (16.95 ± 0.01 pc) |
| Absolute magnitude (M_{V}) | +5.00 |

Details
| Mass | 0.99^{+0.03}_{−0.04} M_{☉} |
| Radius | 0.985±0.022 R_{☉} |
| Luminosity | 0.851±0.005 L_{☉} |
| Surface gravity (log g) | 4.44±0.03 cgs |
| Temperature | 5,627±19 K |
| Metallicity [Fe/H] | 0.08±0.01 dex |
| Rotational velocity (v sin i) | 3 km/s |
| Age | 4.58±1.51 Gyr |

Other designations
- 42 G. Coronae Australis, CD−37°13049, CPD−37°8466, GC 26283, GJ 744, HD 177565, HIP 93858, HR 7232, SAO 210937, LTT 7569

Database references
| SIMBAD | data |
| Exoplanet Archive | data |

HD 177565 (HR 7232; LTT 7569; Gliese 744) is a yellow-hued star located in the southern constellation Corona Australis. It has an apparent magnitude of 6.16, placing it near the limit for naked eye visibility, even under ideal conditions. The object is located relatively close at a distance of 55.3 light-years based on Gaia DR3 parallax measurements, but it is receding rapidly with a heliocentric radial velocity of 60.9 km/s. At its current distance, HD 177565's brightness is diminished by interstellar extinction of 0.07 magnitudes and it has an absolute magnitude of +5.00. A 2017 multiplicity survey failed to detect any stellar companions around the star.

HD 177565 has a stellar classification of G6 V, indicating that it is an ordinary G-type main-sequence star like the Sun. The object has also been given a later class of G8 V (Houk 1982) and one source lists it as a G5 subgiant. It has 99% the mass of the Sun and 98.5% the Sun's radius. It radiates 85.1% the luminosity of the Sun from its photosphere at an effective temperature of 5,627 K, making it slightly cooler than the Sun. HD 177565 is slightly metal enriched with an iron abundance at [Fe/H] = +0.08 (120% solar) and it is estimated to be 4.58 billion years old. HD 177565 spins slightly faster than the Sun with a projected rotational velocity of 3 km/s compared to the Sun's rotational velocity of 2 km/s.

== Planetary system ==
In 2017, an exoplanet was discovered orbiting the star after observations of HARPS data. HD 177565 b is a hot Neptune that takes 44.5 days to revolve around its host star in a relatively circular orbit. However, a 2025 study proposed a completely different planet "b" with a period of 767 days and a minimum mass of 23.5 M_{🜨}, with no mention of the previously published planet.

The HD 177565 planetary system
| Companion (in order from star) | Mass | Semimajor axis (AU) | Orbital period (days) | Eccentricity | Inclination (°) | Radius |
|---|---|---|---|---|---|---|
| b | ≥15.10^{+6.40}_{−6.05} M_{🜨} | 0.246±0.019 | 44.5^{+0.6}_{−0.3} | 0.059^{+0.172}_{−0.058} | — | ~4.1 R_{🜨} |

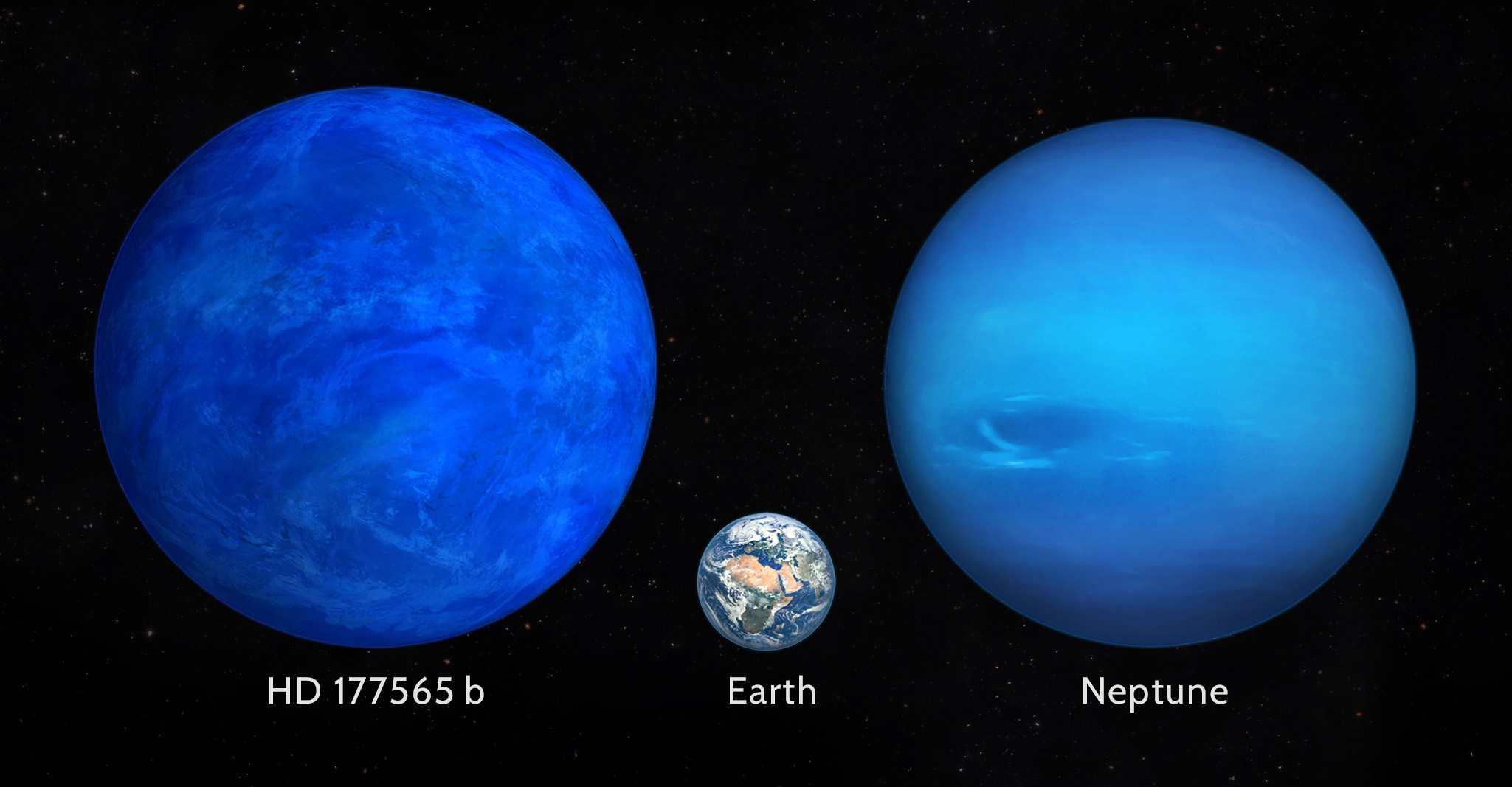
Size comparison of the planet HD 177565 b (artistic concept) with Earth and Neptune
