= HR 7031 =

Binary star in the constellation Corona Australis

HD 172991/172992
- Location of HD 172991 (circled)

Observation data Epoch J2000.0 Equinox J2000.0 (ICRS)
- Constellation: Corona Australis
- Right ascension: 18^{h} 44^{m} 57.15228^{s}
- Declination: −39° 41′ 10.2781″
- Apparent magnitude (V): 5.44±0.01

Characteristics

A
- Spectral type: K1/2III
- B−V color index: +0.87

B
- Spectral type: B9/A1V

Astrometry
Radial velocity (R_{v})	−17.4±0.8 km/s
Proper motion (μ)	RA: +9.815 mas/yr Dec.: −6.261 mas/yr
Parallax (π)	2.6806±0.1453 mas
Distance	1,220 ± 70 ly (370 ± 20 pc)
Absolute magnitude (M_{V})	−2.56

Details

A
Mass	4.98±0.05 M_{☉}
Radius	53.9±3.0 R_{☉}
Luminosity	1,750^{+188}_{−154} L_{☉}
Surface gravity (log g)	1.03 cgs
Temperature	4,990±123 K
Metallicity [Fe/H]	−0.41 dex
Rotational velocity (v sin i)	3.9±2 km/s

Other designations
- 20 G. Coronae Australis, CD−39°12864, CPD−39°8163, GC 25628, HD 172991, 172992, HIP 91989, HR 7031, SAO 210518

Database references
SIMBAD	data

HD 172991, also known as HR 7031 or rarely 20 G. Coronae Australis, is a binary star located in the southern constellation Corona Australis. It has a combined apparent magnitude of 5.44, making it faintly visible to the naked eye. The system is located relatively far at a distance of 1,220 light years based on Gaia DR3 parallax measurements but is receding with a heliocentric radial velocity of −17.4 km/s. At its current distance HD 172991's brightness is diminished by magnitudes due to interstellar dust and it has an absolute magnitude of −2.56.

HD 172991 has a stellar classification of K1/2 III, indicating that it is an evolved red giant. The companion, HD 172992, is a B-type star with a stellar classification of B9/A1 V. Although the two components can be resolved in the spectrum, they cannot be observed in telescopes, making observation difficult.

HD 172991 has 4.98 times the mass of the Sun but it has expanded to 53.9 times the Sun's radius. It radiates 1,750 times the luminosity of the Sun from its enlarged photosphere at an effective temperature of 4,990 K, giving it a yellowish-orange hue. It is metal deficient with an iron abundance 39% of the Sun's ([Fe/H] = −0.41) and spins modestly with a projected rotational velocity of 3.9 km/s.
