= HD 176425 =

A-type dwarf; Corona Australis

- Location of HD 176425 (circled)

Observation data Epoch J2000.0 Equinox ICRS
- Constellation: Corona Australis
- Right ascension: 19^{h} 02^{m} 08.52100^{s}
- Declination: −41° 54′ 37.8260″
- Apparent magnitude (V): 6.21±0.01

Characteristics
- Evolutionary stage: main sequence
- Spectral type: A0 V
- B−V color index: 0.00

Astrometry
Radial velocity (R_{v})	−12.8±4.3 km/s
Proper motion (μ)	RA: +30.557 mas/yr Dec.: −11.271 mas/yr
Parallax (π)	9.1110±0.0417 mas
Distance	358 ± 2 ly (109.8 ± 0.5 pc)
Absolute magnitude (M_{V})	+0.75

Details
Mass	2.63^{+0.38}_{−0.30} M_{☉}
Radius	2.19±0.11 R_{☉}
Luminosity	50.8^{+0.6}_{−0.7} L_{☉}
Surface gravity (log g)	4.23^{+0.05}_{−0.07} cgs
Temperature	10,163 K
Metallicity [Fe/H]	−0.10 dex
Age	286±7 Myr

Other designations
- 38 G. Coronae Australis, CD−42°13839, CPD−42°8564, GC 26164, HD 176425, HIP 93470, HR 7177, SAO 229446

Database references
SIMBAD	data

HD 176425, also known as HR 7177 or rarely 38 G. Coronae Australis, is a solitary, bluish-white hued star located in the southern constellation Corona Australis. It has an apparent magnitude of 6.21, placing it near the limit for naked eye visibility, even under ideal conditions. Gaia DR3 parallax measurements imply a distance of 358 light-years, and it is currently drifting closer with a heliocentric radial velocity of −12.8 km/s. At its current distance, HD 176425's brightness is diminished by an interstellar extinction factor of 0.27 magnitudes and it has an absolute magnitude of +0.75.

HD 176425 is an ordinary A-type main-sequence star with a stellar classification of A0 V. It has been used as an unpolarized standard in the southern sky. It has 2.63 times the mass of the Sun and 2.19 times the radius of the Sun. The object radiates 50.8 times the luminosity of the Sun from its photosphere at an effective temperature of 10,163 K. HD 176425 is metal deficient with an iron abundance 79% that of the Sun ([Fe/H] = −0.10) and it is estimated to be 286 million years old.
