= V718 Coronae Australis =

Slow irregular variable; Corona Australis

- Location of V718 CrA (circled)

Observation data Epoch J2000.0 Equinox ICRS
- Constellation: Corona Australis
- Right ascension: 18^{h} 39^{m} 35.15900^{s}
- Declination: −43° 11′ 09.1691″
- Apparent magnitude (V): 5.43±0.01

Characteristics
- Evolutionary stage: AGB
- Spectral type: M2 III
- B−V color index: +1.63
- Variable type: LB:

Astrometry
Radial velocity (R_{v})	28.5±0.8 km/s
Proper motion (μ)	RA: −32.414 mas/yr Dec.: −43.168 mas/yr
Parallax (π)	5.1919±0.0901 mas
Distance	630 ± 10 ly (193 ± 3 pc)
Absolute magnitude (M_{V})	−1.03

Details
Mass	1.45 or 2 M_{☉}
Radius	101±5 R_{☉}
Luminosity	1,001 L_{☉}
Temperature	3,698±122 K

Other designations
- 18 G. Coronae Australis, V718 CrA, CD−43°12699, CPD−43°8703, GC 25488, HD 171697, HIP 91494, HR 6991, SAO 229172

Database references
SIMBAD	data

V718 Coronae Australis (HD 171697; HR 6991; V718 CrA) is a solitary variable star located in the southern constellation Corona Australis. It is faintly visible to the naked eye as a red-hued point of light with an apparent magnitude of 5.43. Gaia DR3 parallax measurements imply a distance of 630 light years and it is currently receding with a heliocentric radial velocity of 28.5 km/s. At its current distance V718 CrA's brightness is diminished by 0.37 magnitudes due to interstellar dust and it has an absolute magnitude of −1.03.

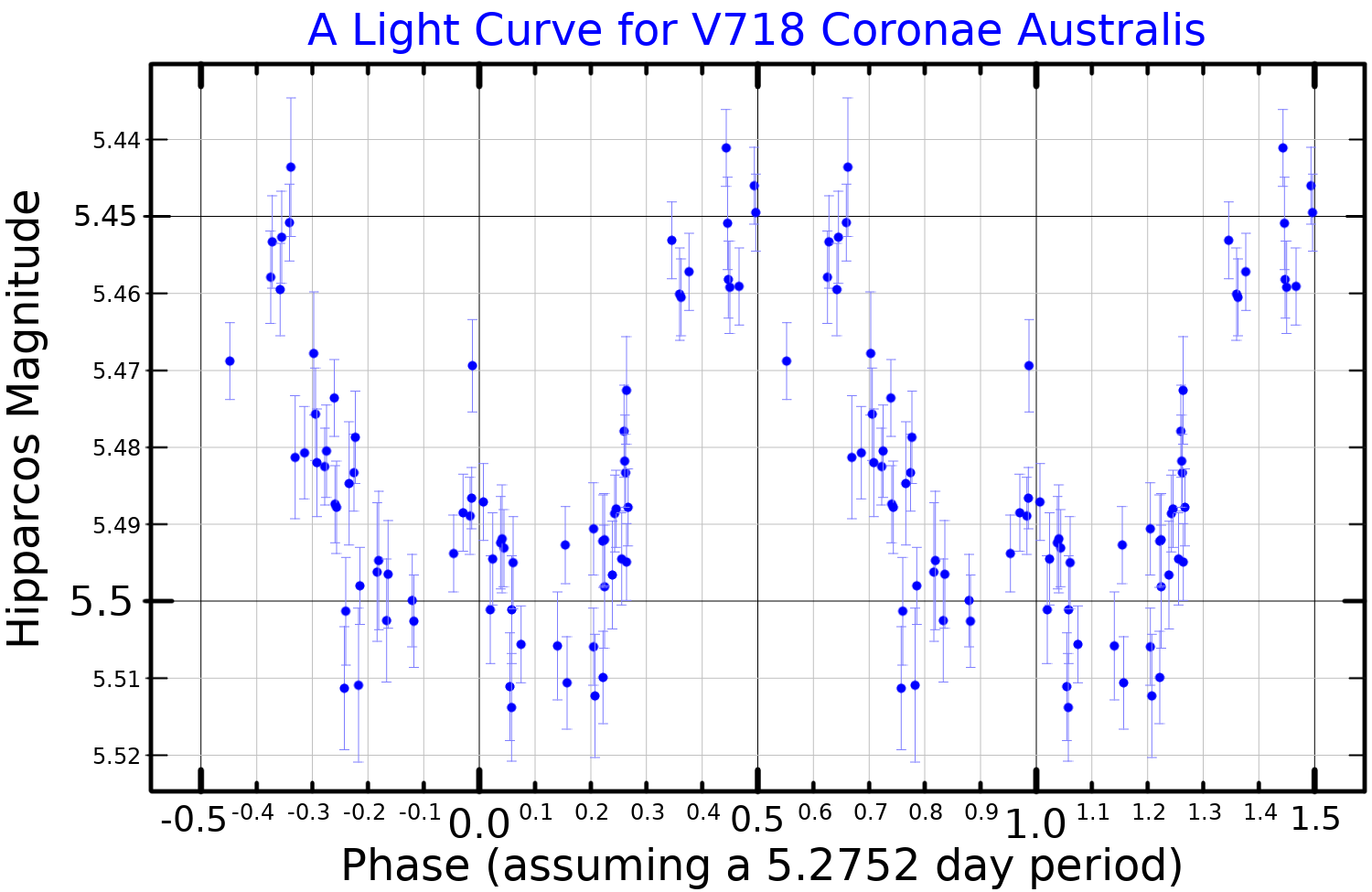
A light curve for V718 Coronae Australis, plotted from Hipparcos data

This object was first noticed to be potentially variable by Olin J. Eggen in 1973. Its variability was confirmed in 1999 after subsequent observations and was given the variable star designation V718 Coronae Australis. Observations from Koen & Laney (2000) reveal that V718 CrA has two periods: one lasting 5.37 days and the other lasting 71.1 days. It is a slow irregular variable of subtype Lb that fluctuates between 5.45 and 5.51 in the Hipparcos passband.

V718 CrA has a stellar classification of M2 III, indicating that it is an evolved red giant. It is currently on the asymptotic giant branch, fusing hydrogen and helium shells around an inert carbon core. It has 1.45 times the mass of the Sun but it has expanded to 101 times the Sun's radius. It radiates 1,001 times the luminosity of the Sun from its enlarged photosphere at an effective temperature of 3,698 K. Oscillation measurements from Koen & Laney (2000) yield a mass of 2 M_{☉}.
