= HD 170384 =

A-type dwarf; Corona Australis

- Location of HD 170384 (circled)

Observation data Epoch J2000.0 Equinox ICRS
- Constellation: Corona Australis
- Right ascension: 18^{h} 31^{m} 02.94877^{s}
- Declination: −41° 54′ 49.8025″
- Apparent magnitude (V): 6.02±0.01

Characteristics
- Evolutionary stage: main sequence star
- Spectral type: A3 V
- B−V color index: +0.14

Astrometry
Radial velocity (R_{v})	−11.4±0.4 km/s
Proper motion (μ)	RA: −3.406 mas/yr Dec.: −31.578 mas/yr
Parallax (π)	14.2387±0.0341 mas
Distance	229.1 ± 0.5 ly (70.2 ± 0.2 pc)
Absolute magnitude (M_{V})	+1.86

Details
Mass	2.00 M_{☉}
Radius	1.91±0.10 R_{☉}
Luminosity	16.7^{+1.1}_{−1.0} L_{☉}
Surface gravity (log g)	4.19^{+0.08}_{−0.07} cgs
Temperature	8,694 K
Metallicity [Fe/H]	−0.01 dex
Rotation	19.2 h
Rotational velocity (v sin i)	127±5 km/s
Age	544 Myr

Other designations
- 11 G. Coronae Australis, CD−41°12871, CPD−41°8697, GC 25249, HD 170384, HIP 90759, HR 6931, SAO 229080

Database references
SIMBAD	data

HD 170384, also known as HR 6931 or rarely 11 G. Coronae Australis, is a solitary white-hued star located in the southern constellation Corona Australis. It has an apparent magnitude of 6.02, making it barely visible to the naked eye, even under ideal conditions. The object is located relatively close at a distance of 229.1 light-years based on Gaia DR3 parallax measurements and it is drifting closer with a heliocentric radial velocity of −11.4 km/s. At its current distance, HD 170384's brightness is diminished by interstellar extinction of 0.28 magnitudes and it has an absolute magnitude of +1.86.

This object has a stellar classification of A3 V, indicating that it is an ordinary A-type main-sequence star. It has double the Sun's mass and 1.91 times the radius of the Sun. It radiates 16.7 times the luminosity of the Sun from its photosphere at an effective temperature of 8,694 K. HD 170384 has a near solar metallicity at [Fe/H] = −0.01 (97% solar) and it is estimated to be 544 million years old, having completed 45% of its main sequence lifetime. Like many hot stars HD 170384 spins rapidly, having a projected rotational velocity of 127 km/s and an estimated rotation period of 19.2 hours.
