= CoRoT-7 =

Star in the constellation Monoceros

Observation data Epoch J2000 Equinox J2000
Constellation	Monoceros
- A
Right ascension	06^{h} 43^{m} 49.4688^{s}
Declination	−01° 03′ 46.817″
- Apparent magnitude (V): 11.668
- B
Right ascension	06^{h} 43^{m} 44.4243^{s}
Declination	−01° 03′ 49.427″

Characteristics

CoRoT-7A
- Evolutionary stage: main sequence
- Spectral type: G9V

CoRoT-7B
- Spectral type: M4

Astrometry

A
Radial velocity (R_{v})	+31.174±0.0086 km/s
Proper motion (μ)	RA: +10.984 mas/yr Dec.: −0.040 mas/yr
Parallax (π)	6.2676±0.0139 mas
Distance	520 ± 1 ly (159.6 ± 0.4 pc)
Absolute magnitude (M_{V})	5.78

B
Proper motion (μ)	RA: +10.900 mas/yr Dec.: −0.047 mas/yr
Parallax (π)	6.1353±0.1028 mas
Distance	532 ± 9 ly (163 ± 3 pc)

Position (relative to CoRoT-7A)
Component	CoRoT-7B
Epoch of observation	2021
Angular distance	75.7″
Projected separation	12160 AU

Details

CoRoT-7A
Mass	0.91±0.03 M_{☉}
Radius	0.82±0.04 R_{☉}
Luminosity	0.51 L_{☉}
Surface gravity (log g)	4.47±0.10 cgs
Temperature	5,250±60 K
Metallicity [Fe/H]	0.12±0.06 dex
Rotation	~23 days
Rotational velocity (v sin i)	<3.5 km/s
Age	(1.2–2.3) × 10^{9} years

CoRoT-7B
Mass	0.23 M_{☉}
Radius	0.29 R_{☉}
Luminosity	0.0087 L_{☉}
Surface gravity (log g)	4.96 cgs
Temperature	3.284 K

Other designations
- 2MASS J06434947-0103468, TYC 4799-1733-1, GSC 04799-01733
- CoRoT-7A: Gaia DR3 3107267177757848576
- CoRoT-7B: Gaia DR3 3107267212116737792

Database references
SIMBAD	data
Exoplanet Archive	data

CoRoT-7 (TYC 4799-1733-1) is a binary star system made up of a late G-type star and a M-dwarf star that was discovered in 2021. The primary star has three exoplanets, including CoRoT-7b, a super-Earth exoplanet that is remarkable due to its extremely high temperature (around 2000 °C) and very short orbital period, around 20 hours. It was the first exoplanet shown to be rocky. The system has the name CoRoT-7 after the CoRoT space telescope, which discovered the exoplanets around the star CoRoT-7A. The stellar system is 520 light-years from the Earth.

== Stellar components ==
=== CoRoT-7A ===
The primary, CoRoT-7A is a G-type main sequence star, slightly smaller, cooler, and younger than the Sun. It has an apparent magnitude of 11.67, fainter than Proxima Centauri (mag. 11.05), the nearest star to the Sun, and is far too faint to be seen with the naked eye. This star is approximately 520 light-years away from the Solar System in the constellation Monoceros (the Unicorn).

=== CoRoT-7B ===
The comoving companion CoRoT-7B was discovered in 2021. It is a red dwarf star.

== Location and properties ==
The star is located in the LRa01 field of view of the CoRoT spacecraft. It is about 500 light years from Earth. According to the project website, this field is in the Monoceros constellation. Published data lists the stellar properties as being a G9V yellow dwarf with a temperature of 5250 K, a radius of about 82% of the Sun and a mass of about 91% of the Sun, But other sources have listed it as a (K0V) orange dwarf. The metallicity is 0.12 ± 0.06. The star is estimated to be about 150 parsecs away, with an age in the range 1.2 – 2.3 billion years, younger than our own star which has an age of 4.6 billion years. The rotation period of the star, inferred by the light curve obtained by CoRoT, is around 23 days.

== Planetary system ==
The primary star is orbited by the super-Earth exoplanets CoRoT-7b and CoRoT-7c, both discovered in 2009. A third planet CoRoT-7d, initially proposed in a 2010 study, was confirmed in 2022. The discovery of the inner planet was made using the transit method by the CoRoT program. CoRoT-7b is notable for its relatively small size, compared to other exoplanets known at the time.

The CoRoT-7 planetary system
Companion (in order from star)	Mass	Semimajor axis (AU)	Orbital period (days)	Eccentricity	Inclination (°)	Radius
b	6.056±0.653 M_{🜨}	0.0172 ± 0.00029	0.853592±0.000000587	0	80.98±0.51	1.528±0.065 R_{🜨}
c	13.289±0.689 M_{🜨}	0.046	3.697±0.005	0	—	—
d	17.142±2.552 M_{🜨}	0.08	8.966±1.546	0	—	—

Because of the large difference in brightness between them and their parent star, these exoplanets cannot be seen in a telescope; only their gravitational effect can be detected by the Doppler effect on the star's electromagnetic spectrum (radial velocity method), as well as transits of planet b. This star was reported to have stellar activity, making the confirmation process for CoRoT-7b more difficult. In fact, mass estimates are affected by large uncertainty due to stellar activity that perturbs the radial velocity measurements needed to "weigh" the planets.

CoRoT-7d was first proposed by A. P. Hatzes et al. in 2010 by the radial velocity method. The existence of CoRoT-7d was disputed by a 2014 study, which concluded that the radial velocity signal was more likely to be an artifact of the stellar rotation. However, a 2022 study provided strong evidence for the existence of this planet, and it is now listed as a confirmed planet in the NASA Exoplanet Archive. CoRoT-7d's mass is 17.1 times that of Earth, but its volume and diameter are unknown. One year on CoRoT-7d would be equivalent to 8.966 days on Earth.
