= HD 166114 =

F-type dwarf; Corona Australis

- Location of HD 166114 (circled)

Observation data Epoch J2000.0 Equinox J2000.0 (ICRS)
- Constellation: Corona Australis
- Right ascension: 18^{h} 11^{m} 05.56282^{s}
- Declination: −41° 21′ 32.8142″
- Apparent magnitude (V): 5.85±0.01

Characteristics
- Evolutionary stage: main sequence
- Spectral type: F2 V or F0 Vn
- B−V color index: +0.29

Astrometry
Radial velocity (R_{v})	−4±4.3 km/s
Proper motion (μ)	RA: +30.884 mas/yr Dec.: −37.254 mas/yr
Parallax (π)	12.3631±0.2238 mas
Distance	264 ± 5 ly (81 ± 1 pc)
Absolute magnitude (M_{V})	+1.28

Details
Mass	1.68 M_{☉}
Radius	3.14±0.16 R_{☉}
Luminosity	25.6±0.9 L_{☉}
Surface gravity (log g)	3.80^{+0.09}_{−0.08} cgs
Temperature	7,465±254 K
Metallicity [Fe/H]	−0.09 dex
Age	1.20 Gyr

Other designations
- 2 G. Coronae Australis, CD−41°12491, CPD−41°8614, FK5 3444, GC 24769, HD 166114, HIP 89099, HR 6786, SAO 228778

Database references
SIMBAD	data

HD 166114, also known as HR 6786 or rarely 2 G. Coronae Australis, is a solitary, yellowish-white hued star located in the southern constellation Corona Australis. It has an apparent magnitude of 5.85, making it faintly visible to the naked eye under ideal conditions. The object is located relatively close at a distance of 264 light-years based on Gaia DR3 parallax measurements, and it is currently approaching the Solar System with a poorly constrained heliocentric radial velocity of −4 km/s. At its current distance, HD 166114's brightness is diminished by an extinction of 0.31 magnitudes and it has an absolute magnitude of +1.28.

HD 166114 has a stellar classification of either F2 V or F0 Vn—both indicating that it is a F-type main-sequence star. The second class also displays a presence of nebulous or broad absorption lines due to rapid rotation. Abt and Morell (1995) give a class of A8 IV, instead indicating that it is a slightly evolved A-type subgiant. Gaia DR3 models it to be a rather evolved main sequence star.

The object has 1.68 times the mass of the Sun and a slightly enlarged radius of 3.14 R_{☉}. It radiates 25.6 times the luminosity of the Sun from its photosphere at an effective temperature of 7,465 K. HD 166114 is slightly metal deficient with an iron abundance 81% that of the Sun ([Fe/H] = −0.09) and it is estimated to be 1.2 billion years old.
