= GJ 1214 b =

Sub-Neptune orbiting GJ 1214

GJ 1214 b / Enaiposha
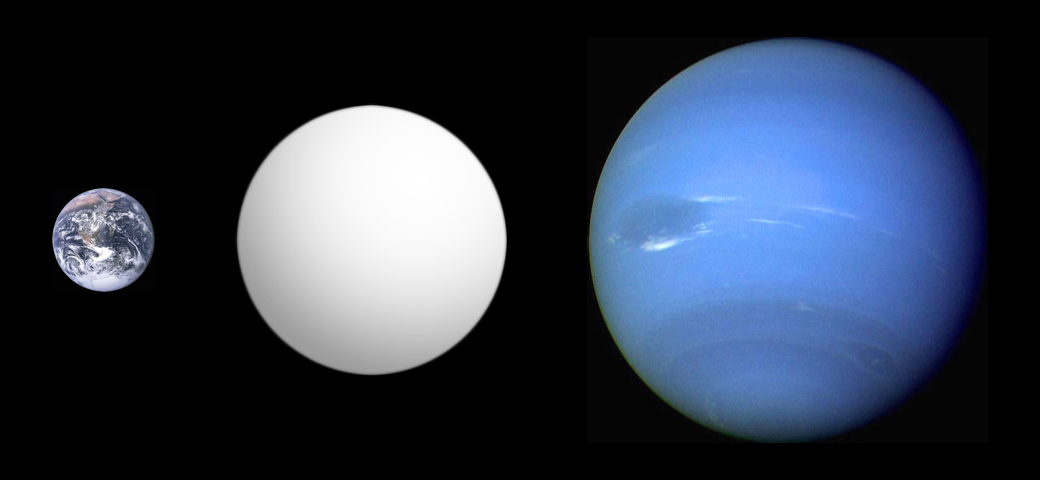
- Size comparison of Enaiposha with Earth (left) and Neptune (right). The actual color of Enaiposha is not yet known.

Discovery
- Discovered by: David Charbonneau, et al.
- Discovery site: Fred Lawrence Whipple Observatory
- Discovery date: December 16, 2009
- Detection method: Transit (MEarth Project)

Designations
- Alternative names: Enaiposha, Gliese 1214 b

Orbital characteristics
- Semi-major axis: 0.01505±0.00011
- Eccentricity: 0.0062+0.0044 −0.0079
- Orbital period (sidereal): 1.580404531+18 −17 d
- Inclination: 88.980°+0.094° −0.085°
- Semi-amplitude: 14.38+0.57 −0.56 m/s
- Star: Orkaria/GJ 1214

Physical characteristics
- Mean radius: 2.733+0.033 −0.031 R_{🜨}
- Mass: 8.41+0.36 −0.35 M_{🜨}
- Mean density: 2.20+0.17 −0.16 g/cm^{3}
- Surface gravity: 10.65+0.71 −0.67 m/s^{2} (1.09 g)
- Escape velocity: 19.31+0.53 −0.54 km/s
- Albedo: 0.51±0.06 (Bond)
- Temperature: 553±9 K (280 °C; 536 °F, dayside); 437±19 K (164 °C; 327 °F, nightside)

GJ 1214 b (sometimes Gliese 1214 b, formally named Enaiposha since 2023) is an exoplanet with a very high temperature that orbits the star GJ 1214, discovered in December 2009. Its parent star is 48 light-years (15 pc) from the Sun, in the constellation Ophiuchus. At the time of its discovery, GJ 1214 b was the most likely known candidate for being an ocean planet. For that reason, scientists at that time often called the planet a "waterworld". However, a recent study of the planet's internal structure informed by observations taken with the James Webb Space Telescope suggests that a "waterworld" composition is implausible and the planet is more likely to host a thick gaseous envelope consisting of hydrogen, helium, water and other volatile chemicals such as methane or carbon dioxide.

It is a sub-Neptune, meaning it is larger than Earth but is significantly smaller (in mass and radius) than the gas giants of the Solar System. After CoRoT-7b, it was the second planet between Earth and Neptune in mass to have both its mass and radius measured and is the first of a new class of planets with small size and relatively low density. GJ 1214 b is also significant because its parent star is relatively near the Sun and because it transits that parent star, which allows the planet's atmosphere to be studied using spectroscopic methods.

== Name ==
In August 2022, this planet and its host star were included among 20 systems to be named by the third NameExoWorlds project. The approved names, proposed by a team from Kenya, were announced in June 2023. GJ 1214 b is named Enaiposha and its host star is named Orkaria, after the Maa words for a large body of water and for red ochre, alluding to the likely composition of the planet and color of the star.

== Physical characteristics ==
=== Mass, radius and temperature ===
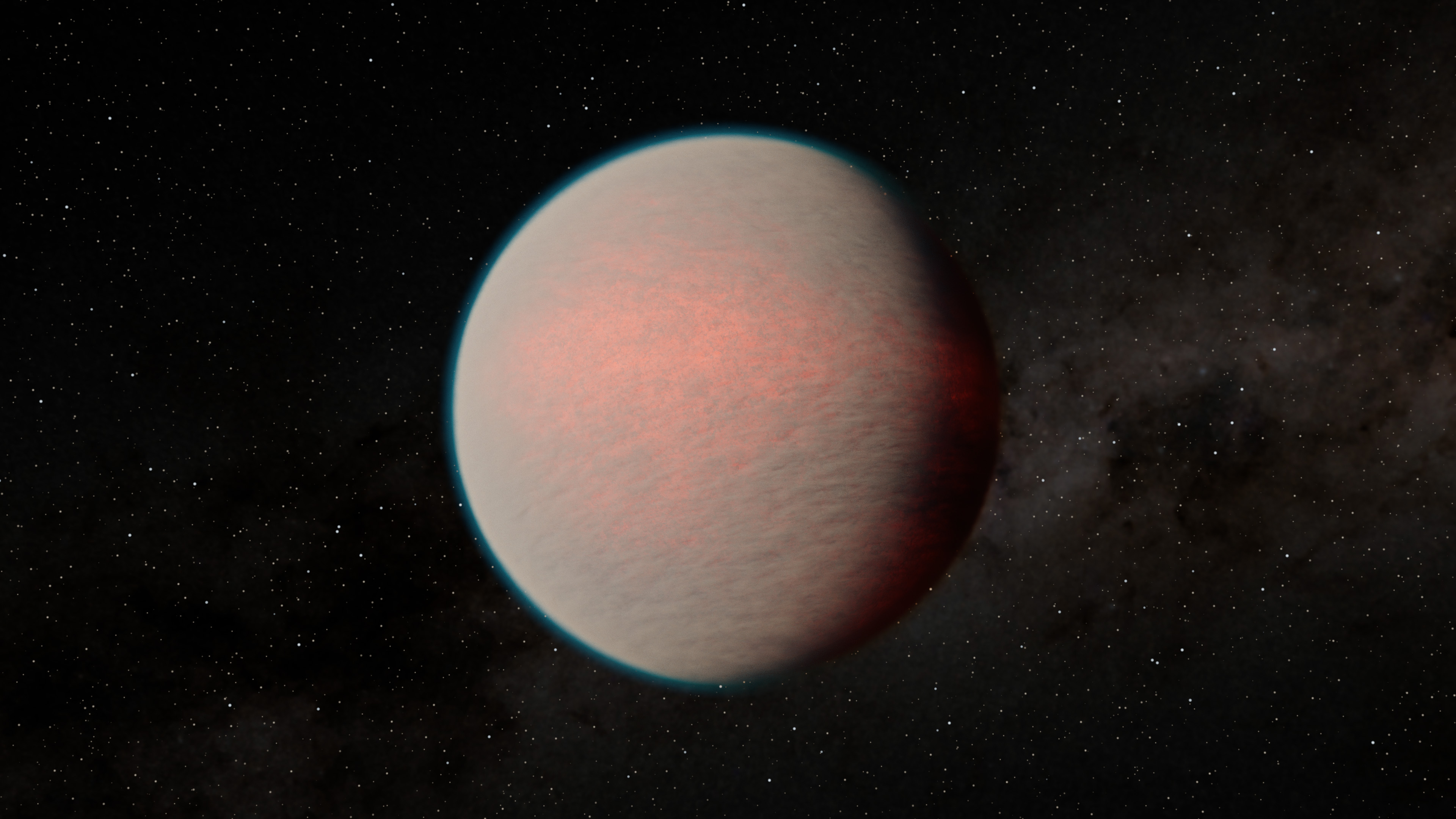
Artist's impression of the planet with a hazy steam atmosphere

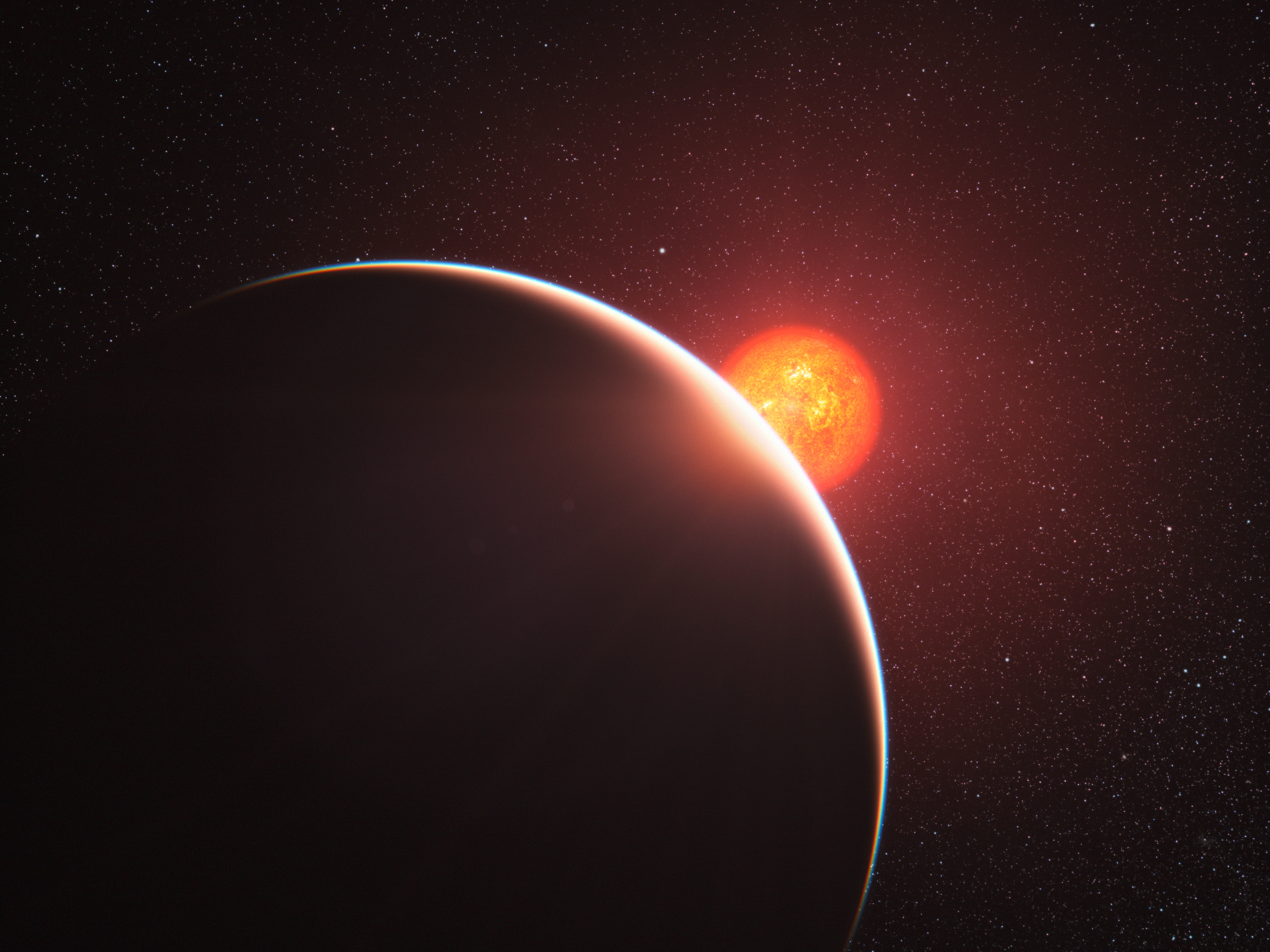
Artist's impression of GJ 1214 b (foreground), illuminated by the red light of its parent star (center)

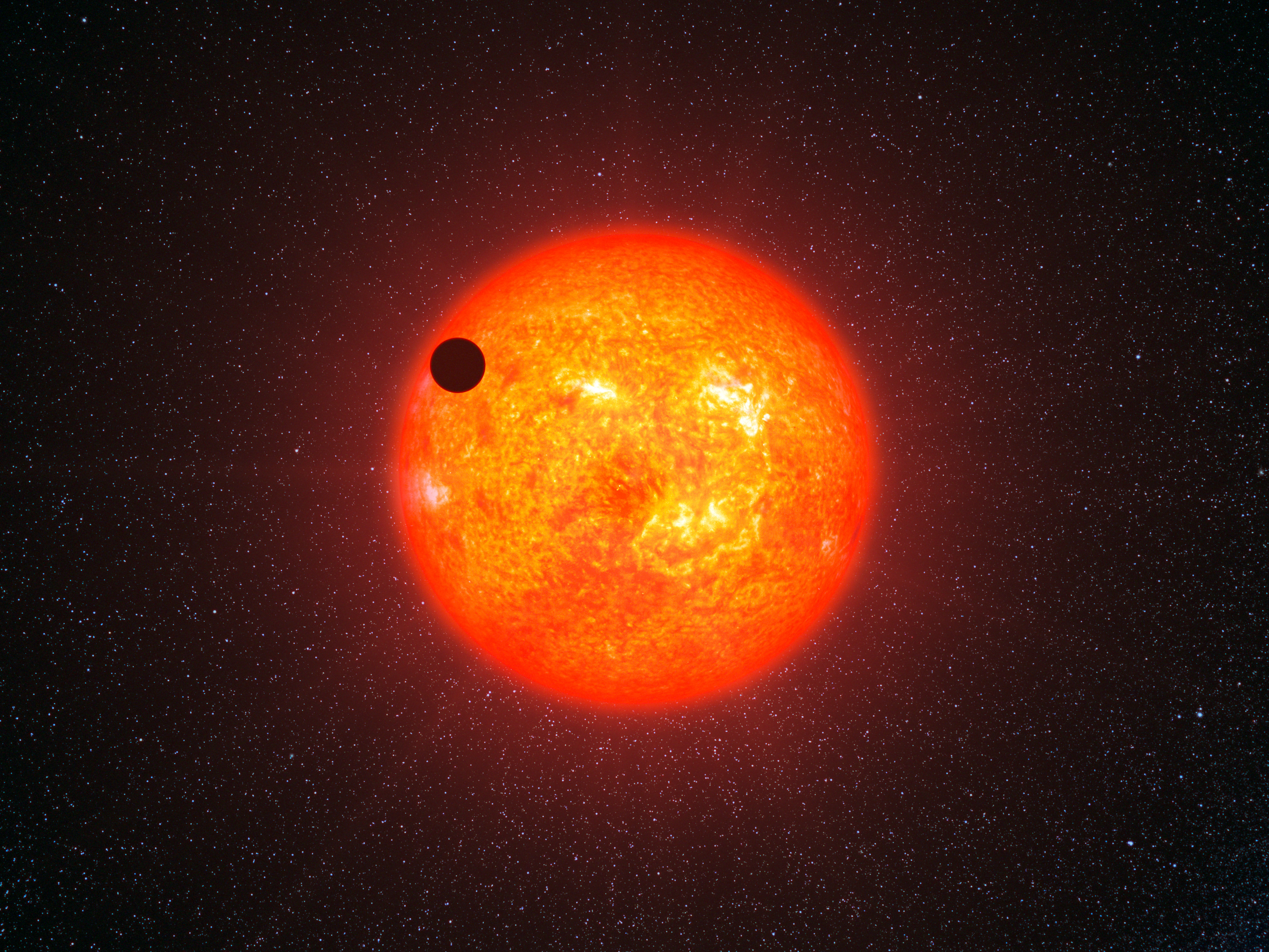
This artist's impression shows how GJ 1214 b may look as it transits its parent star. It is the second super-Earth for which astronomers have determined the mass and radius, giving vital clues about its structure.

The radius of GJ 1214 b can be inferred from the amount of dimming seen when the planet crosses in front of its parent star as viewed from Earth, yielding a radius of 2.733+0.033
−0.031 R_{🜨}. The mass of the planet can be inferred from sensitive observations of the parent star's radial velocity, measured through small shifts in stellar spectral lines due to the Doppler effect, yielding a mass of 8.41+0.36
−0.35 M_{🜨}. Given the planet's mass and radius, its density can be calculated. Through a comparison with theoretical models, the density in turn provides limited but highly useful information about the composition and structure of the planet.

GJ 1214 b may be cooler than any other known transiting planet prior to the discovery of Kepler-16b in 2011 by the Kepler mission. Its equilibrium temperature is believed to be in the range of 393–555 K (120–282 °C; 248–539 °F), depending on how much of the star's radiation is reflected into space.

=== Atmosphere ===
Due to the relatively small size of GJ 1214 b's parent star, it is feasible to perform spectroscopic observations during planetary transits. By comparing the observed spectrum before and during transits, the spectrum of the planetary atmosphere can be inferred. In December 2010, a study was published showing the spectrum to be largely featureless over the wavelength range of 750–1000 nm. Because a thick and cloud-free hydrogen-rich atmosphere would have produced detectable spectral features, such an atmosphere appears to be ruled out. Although no clear signs were observed of water vapor or any other molecule, the authors of the study believe the planet may have an atmosphere composed mainly of water vapor. Another possibility is that there may be a thick layer of high clouds, which absorbs the starlight. Because of the estimated old age of the planetary system and the calculated hydrodynamic escape (loss of gasses that tends to deplete an atmosphere of higher molecular-weight constituents) rate of 900 tonnes per second, scientists conclude that there has been a significant atmospheric loss during the lifetime of the planet and any current atmosphere cannot be primordial. The loss of primordial atmosphere was indirectly confirmed in 2020 as no helium was detected at GJ 1214 b. Helium was tentatively detected in the atmosphere of GJ 1214 b by 2022 though.

In December 2013, NASA reported that clouds may have been detected in the atmosphere of GJ 1214 b. The atmosphere of GJ 1214 b may be abundant in carbon dioxide, which resembles the planet Venus, according to a 2024 study.

=== Possible compositions ===
While very little is known about GJ 1214 b, there has been speculation as to its specific nature and composition. On the basis of planetary models it has been suggested that GJ 1214 b has a relatively thick gaseous envelope, totaling about 5% of planetary mass. It is possible to propose structures by assuming different compositions, guided by scenarios for the formation and evolution of the planet. GJ 1214 b could potentially be a rocky planet with an outgassed hydrogen-rich atmosphere, a mini-Neptune, or an ocean planet. If it is a waterworld, it could possibly be thought of as a bigger and hotter version of Jupiter's Galilean moon Europa. While no scientist has stated to believe GJ 1214 b is an ocean planet, if GJ 1214 b is assumed to be an ocean planet, i.e. the interior is assumed to be composed primarily of a water core surrounded by more water, proportions of the total mass consistent with the mass and radius are about 25% rock and 75% water, covered by a thick envelope of gases such as hydrogen and helium (c. 0.05%). Water planets could result from inward planetary migration and originate as protoplanets that formed from volatile ice-rich material beyond the snow-line but that never attained masses sufficient to accrete large amounts of H/He nebular gas. Because of the varying pressure at depth, models of a water world include "steam, liquid, superfluid, high-pressure ices, and plasma phases" of water. Some of the solid-phase water could be in the form of ice VII.

In January 2025, spectroscopic analysis of GJ 1214 b revealed its atmospheric contents to be metallic, with carbon-dioxide acting as an aerosol, suspended above it. This layout was noted to be similar to that of a "Super-Venus," although further analysis is needed to confirm whether the weak elemental readings are not a statistical anomaly. These discoveries make it unlikely that GJ 1214 b is an ocean planet.

== Discovery ==
GJ 1214 b was first detected by the MEarth Project, which searches for the small drops in brightness that can occur when an orbiting planet briefly passes in front of its parent star. In early 2009, the astronomers running the project noticed that the star GJ 1214 appeared to show drops in brightness of that sort. They then observed the star more closely and confirmed that it dimmed by roughly 1.5% every 1.58 days. Follow-up radial-velocity measurements were then made with the HARPS spectrograph on the ESO's 3.6-meter telescope at La Silla, Chile; those measurements succeeded in providing independent evidence for the reality of the planet. A paper was then published in Nature announcing the planet and giving estimates of its mass, radius, and orbital parameters.

== See also ==
- CoRoT-7b
- Gliese 581 c
- Gliese 581 d
- Gliese 876 d
- HD 149026 b
- Steam world
- Lists of astronomical objects
- MOA-2007-BLG-192Lb
