= HD 170521 =

Distant K-type giant; Corona Australis

- Location of HD 170521 (circled)

Observation data Epoch J2000.0 Equinox ICRS
- Constellation: Corona Australis
- Right ascension: 18^{h} 31^{m} 56.22382^{s}
- Declination: −43° 30′ 26.5714″
- Apparent magnitude (V): 5.69±0.01

Characteristics
- Spectral type: K2 III
- B−V color index: +1.34

Astrometry
Radial velocity (R_{v})	7.2±0.4 km/s
Proper motion (μ)	RA: −1.328 mas/yr Dec.: −8.795 mas/yr
Parallax (π)	2.1538±0.1596 mas
Distance	1,500 ± 100 ly (460 ± 30 pc)
Absolute magnitude (M_{V})	−1.90

Details
Mass	1.55 M_{☉}
Radius	78.6±4.1 R_{☉}
Luminosity	934 L_{☉}
Surface gravity (log g)	0.96 cgs
Temperature	4,474±122 K
Metallicity [Fe/H]	−0.49 dex
Rotational velocity (v sin i)	6.5±1 km/s

Other designations
- 12 G. Coronae Australis, CD−43°12600, CPD−34°8647, GC 25272, HD 170521, HIP 90842, HR 6937, SAO 229094

Database references
SIMBAD	data

HD 170521, also known as HR 6937 or rarely 12 G. Coronae Australis, is a solitary star located in the southern constellation Corona Australis. It is faintly visible to the naked eye as an orange-hued point of light with an apparent magnitude of 5.69. The object is located relatively far at a distance of approximately 1,500 light years based on Gaia DR3 parallax measurements, and it is receding with a heliocentric radial velocity of 7.2 km/s. At its current distance, HD 170521's brightness is heavily diminished by 0.46 magnitudes due to extinction from interstellar dust and it has an absolute magnitude of −1.90.

HD 170521 has a stellar classification of K2 III, indicating that it is an evolved red giant. It has 1.55 times the mass of the Sun but it has expanded to 78.6 times the Sun's radius. The object radiates 934 times the luminosity of the Sun from its enlarged photosphere at an effective temperature of 4,474 K. HD 170521 is metal deficient with an iron abundance only 32.4% that of the Sun (Fe/H) = −0.49 and it spins modestly with a projected rotational velocity of 6.5 km/s.
