= HD 169853 =

Am star; Corona Australis

- Location of HD 169853 (circled)

Observation data Epoch J2000.0 Equinox J2000.0 (ICRS)
- Constellation: Corona Australis
- Right ascension: 18^{h} 28^{m} 27.11405^{s}
- Declination: −38° 59′ 44.4102″
- Apparent magnitude (V): 5.62±0.01

Characteristics
- Evolutionary stage: main sequence
- Spectral type: A2m A2-F0 or A3 III
- B−V color index: +0.13

Astrometry
Radial velocity (R_{v})	−21.3±1.2 km/s
Proper motion (μ)	RA: +0.096 mas/yr Dec.: −41.093 mas/yr
Parallax (π)	8.3424±0.0673 mas
Distance	391 ± 3 ly (119.9 ± 1.0 pc)
Absolute magnitude (M_{V})	+0.13

Details
Mass	2.09^{+0.39}_{−0.25} M_{☉}
Radius	3.72±0.12 R_{☉}
Luminosity	60.7^{+1.0}_{−1.1} L_{☉}
Surface gravity (log g)	3.64 cgs
Temperature	8,437±164 K
Metallicity [Fe/H]	−0.01 dex
Rotational velocity (v sin i)	22.6±0.3 km/s
Age	585^{+67}_{−66} Myr

Other designations
- 9 G. Coronae Australis, CD−39°12626, CPD−39°8093, GC 25185, HD 169853, HIP 90541, HR 6910, SAO 210197

Database references
SIMBAD	data

HD 169853, also known as HR 6910 or rarely 9 G. Coronae Australis, is a solitary star located in the southern constellation Corona Australis. It is faintly visible to the naked eye as a white-hued point of light with an apparent magnitude of 5.62. Gaia DR3 parallax measurements imply a distance of 391 light years, and it is currently approaching the Solar System with a heliocentric radial velocity of −21.3 km/s. At its current distance, HD 169853's brightness is diminished by 0.36 magnitudes due to extinction from interstellar dust and it has an absolute magnitude of +0.13.

HD 169853 has a stellar classification of A2mA2-F0, indicating that it is an Am star with the calcium H lines of an A2 star and the metallic lines of an F0 star. Abt and Morell (1995) give a class of A3 III, indicating that the object is instead an evolved A-type giant star with no chemical peculiarities. A paper published in late 1987 found that HD 169853 had an overabundance of silicon, manganese, strontium, and barium.

The object has 2.09 times the mass of the Sun and a slightly enlarged radius of 3.72 R_{☉}. It radiates 60.7 times the luminosity of the Sun from its photosphere at an effective temperature of 8,437 K. It has a near solar metallicity at (Fe/H) = −0.01 and it is estimated to be 585 million years old, having completed 80% of its main sequence lifetime. Like many chemically peculiar stars, HD 169853 rotates rather slowly, having a projected rotational velocity of 22.6 km/s.
