= HD 175219 =

K-type giant; Corona Australis

- Location of HD 175219 (circled)

Observation data Epoch J2000.0 Equinox ICRS
- Constellation: Corona Australis
- Right ascension: 18^{h} 56^{m} 16.95125^{s}
- Declination: −42° 42′ 38.4231″
- Apparent magnitude (V): 5.35±0.01

Characteristics
- Spectral type: K0 III or G6 III-IV
- B−V color index: +1.00

Astrometry
Radial velocity (R_{v})	−21.1±0.8 km/s
Proper motion (μ)	RA: −27.046 mas/yr Dec.: −29.284 mas/yr
Parallax (π)	10.3847±0.109 mas
Distance	314 ± 3 ly (96 ± 1 pc)
Absolute magnitude (M_{V})	+0.57

Details
Mass	1.93±0.21 M_{☉}
Radius	12.3±0.2 R_{☉}
Luminosity	76.3±2.0 L_{☉}
Surface gravity (log g)	2.55±0.07 cgs
Temperature	4,877±26 K
Metallicity [Fe/H]	−0.28±0.02 dex
Rotational velocity (v sin i)	<1 km/s
Age	346 Myr

Other designations
- 30 G. Coronae Australis, CD−42°13761, CPD−42°8539, GC 25956, HD 175219, HIP 92953, HR 7122, SAO 229383

Database references
SIMBAD	data

HD 175219, also known as HR 7122, is a solitary, orange hued star located in the southern constellation Corona Australis. It has an apparent magnitude of 5.35, allowing it to be faintly visible to the naked eye. The object is located relatively close at a distance of 314 light years based on Gaia DR3 parallax measurements but is drifting closer with a heliocentric radial velocity of −21.1 km/s. At its current distance, HD 175219's brightness is diminished by 0.26 magnitudes due to interstellar dust. It has an absolute magnitude of +0.57.

This is a red giant with a stellar classification of K0 III. An earlier source gives it a class of G6 III-IV, indicating that it is an evolved G-type star with a luminosity class intermediate between a giant star and a subgiant. At present it has nearly twice the mass of the Sun but it has expanded to 12.3 times the Sun's radius. HD 175219 radiates 76.3 times the luminosity of the Sun from its enlarged photosphere at an effective temperature of 4,877 K. The star is metal deficient, having less than half the abundance of heavy elements compared to the Sun. Common for giant stars, it spins slowly, having a projected rotational velocity too low to be measured accurately.
