= MEarth Project =

Part of the Fred Lawrence Whipple Observatory in Arizona

The MEarth Project (pronounced mirth) is a NSF-funded project in the United States. It is a robotic exoplanet observatory that is part of the Fred Lawrence Whipple Observatory on Mount Hopkins in Arizona. The project monitors the brightness of thousands of red dwarf stars with the goal of finding transiting planets. As red dwarf stars are small, any transiting planet blocks a larger proportion of starlight than transits around a Sun-like star would, allowing smaller planets to be detected through ground-based observations.

== Equipment ==
The original MEarth-North observatory on Mount Hopkins consists of eight RC Optical Systems 40 cm (16 in) f/9 Ritchey-Chrétien telescopes equipped with 2048 × 2048 Apogee U42 CCDs, infrared filters, and equatorial mounts. It began operation in January 2008.

In 2014, the MEarth-South observatory began operations at the Cerro Tololo Inter-American Observatory site east of La Serena, Chile, extending MEarth's coverage to the southern celestial hemisphere using a nearly identical eight-telescope array. Unlike MEarth-North, the telescopes in Chile are also sensitive to red light.

== Planets discovered ==
- GJ 1214 b
- GJ 1132 b
- LHS 1140 b
