= CoRoT-7b =

Hot Super-Earth orbiting CoRoT-7

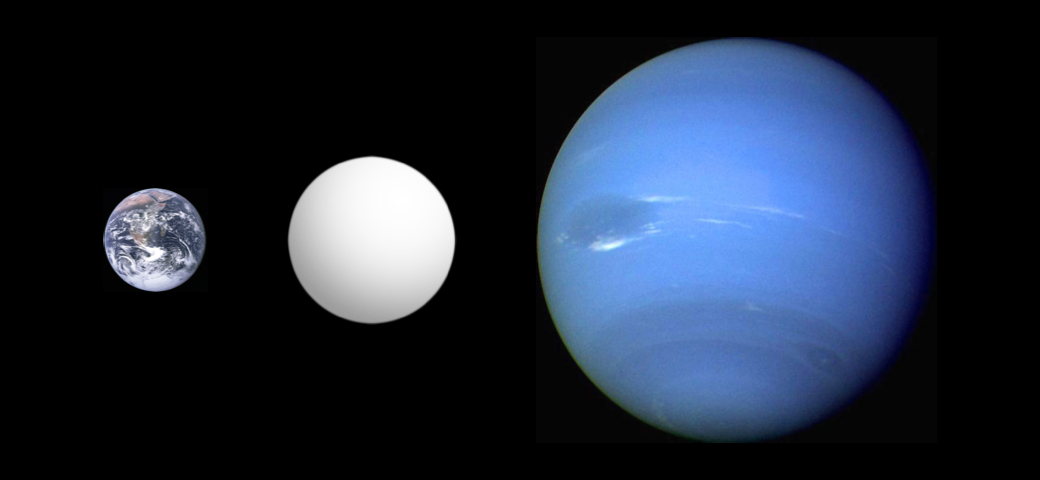
- Size comparison of CoRoT-7b (center) with Earth (left) and Neptune (right)

Discovery
- Discovered by: Rouan et al. (CoRoT)
- Discovery site: Polar orbit
- Discovery date: February 3, 2009
- Detection method: Transit

Orbital characteristics
- Semi-major axis: 0.0172 ± 0.00029 AU (2.573 ± 0.043 million km; 1.599 ± 0.027 million mi)
- Eccentricity: 0
- Orbital period (sidereal): 0.853585 ± 0.000024 d (20.48604 ± 0.00058 h)
- Inclination: 80.1 ± 0.3
- Star: CoRoT-7

Physical characteristics
- Mean radius: 1.528±0.065 R_{🜨}
- Mass: 6.06±0.65 M_{🜨}
- Temperature: 1,300–1,800 K (1,030–1,530 °C; 1,880–2,780 °F)

CoRoT-7b (previously named CoRoT-Exo-7b) is an exoplanet orbiting the star CoRoT-7 in the constellation of Monoceros, 520 light-years (159 parsecs) from the Earth. It was first detected photometrically by the French-led CoRoT mission and reported in February 2009. Until the announcement of Kepler-10b in January 2011, it was the smallest exoplanet to have its diameter measured, at 1.58 times that of the Earth (which would give it a volume about 3.94 times Earth's) and the first potential extrasolar terrestrial planet to be found. The exoplanet has a very short orbital period, revolving around its host star in about 20 hours.

Combination of the planet's diameter derived from transit data with the planet's mass derived from radial velocity measurements means that the density of CoRoT-7b is about the same as that of Earth; therefore, CoRoT-7b is a terrestrial planet like Earth and not a gas giant like Jupiter. The radial velocity observations of CoRoT-7 also detected a second super-Earth, CoRoT-7c, which has a mass 8.4 times that of Earth and orbits every 3.7 days at a distance of 6.9 million km (0.046 AU; 4.3 million mi).

== Discovery ==
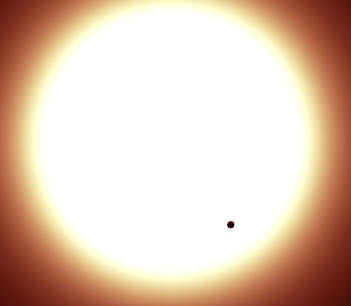
Artist conception of CoRoT-7b transiting yellow dwarf CoRoT-7

CoRoT-7b was found by observing its parent star's periodic decrease in apparent magnitude caused by the planet's transit in front of the star as seen from Earth. Measuring this dip in brightness, together with a size estimate for the star, allows calculating the planet's size. (See Transit method.) The space mission CoRoT observed the star CoRoT-7, in the stellar field LRa01, from October 15, 2007, to March 3, 2008. During this period, 153 periodic transit signals of 1.3 h duration with a depth of 3.4 × 10^{−4} were registered. After 40 days of data acquisition, the Alarm mode pipeline algorithm detected the shallow signal of CoRoT-7b, starting the follow-up observations from the ground to get a confirmation of the planetary nature of the transiting object.

The discovery of CoRoT-7b was announced a year later on February 3, 2009, during the CoRoT Symposium 2009 in Paris. It was published in a special issue of the journal Astronomy and Astrophysics dedicated to results from CoRoT.

== Mass ==
After the detection of CoRoT-7b in the lightcurve, follow-up observations carried out with a network of ground-based telescopes ruled out nearly completely the possibility of a false positive detection. The HARPS spectrograph was subsequently used to measure the mass of CoRoT-7b with the radial velocity method. The strong activity of the host star, which perturbates radial velocity measurements, made the mass determination troublesome.

The discovery paper, by Queloz et al., weighed the planet at about 4.8 Earth masses, giving it a density of 5.6 ± 1.3 g cm^{−3}, similar to Earth's. The value was obtained using a pre-whitening procedure and harmonic decomposition. It was also inferred that there was a second non-transiting planet in the system, CoRoT-7c, with a 3.7-day orbital period.

A second paper, by Hatzes et al., employing Fourier analysis, reported a likely mass of 6.9 Earth masses for CoRoT-7b, and found hints for the presence of a third planet in the system, CoRoT-7d, with mass similar to Neptune's and a 9-day orbital period.

Pont et al. evidences larger-than-declared systematic errors in the HARPS measurements, estimating CoRoT-7b to be between one and four Earth masses. The radial velocity confirmation of the planet is in shaky ground too, with a tentative detection of only 1.2 sigma certainty.

Boisse et al., employing simultaneous fitting of stellar activity and planetary signals in the radial velocity data, calculate for CoRoT-7b a mass of 5.7 Earth masses, though with a very large uncertainty.

The CoRoT team then published a second paper on CoRoT-7b's mass, removing stellar activity through analysis only of radial velocity data for which multiple measurements were taken in a given night. The planet is weighed at 7.42 Earth masses, yielding an average density of 10.4 ± 1.8 g cm^{−3}, far higher than the Earth's and similar to that of the second rocky planet found, Kepler-10b.

A last study by Ferraz-Mello et al. improved the approach used in the discovery paper, finding that it downsized the amplitude of the planets' induced radial velocities. It reports for CoRoT-7b a heavier mass of 8 Earth masses, in agreement with the second paper published by the CoRoT team. Thus, CoRoT-7b may be rocky with a large iron core, with an internal structure more like Mercury than Earth.

== Spitzer observations ==
An independent validation of CoRoT-7b as a planet is supplied by follow-up performed with the space based Spitzer telescope. Its observations confirmed the transits of the planet, with the same depth, at different wavelengths than the ones observed by CoRoT. The data then allows to validate CoRoT-7b as a bona-fide planet with a very high degree of confidence, independently from the noisy radial velocity data.

== Characteristics ==
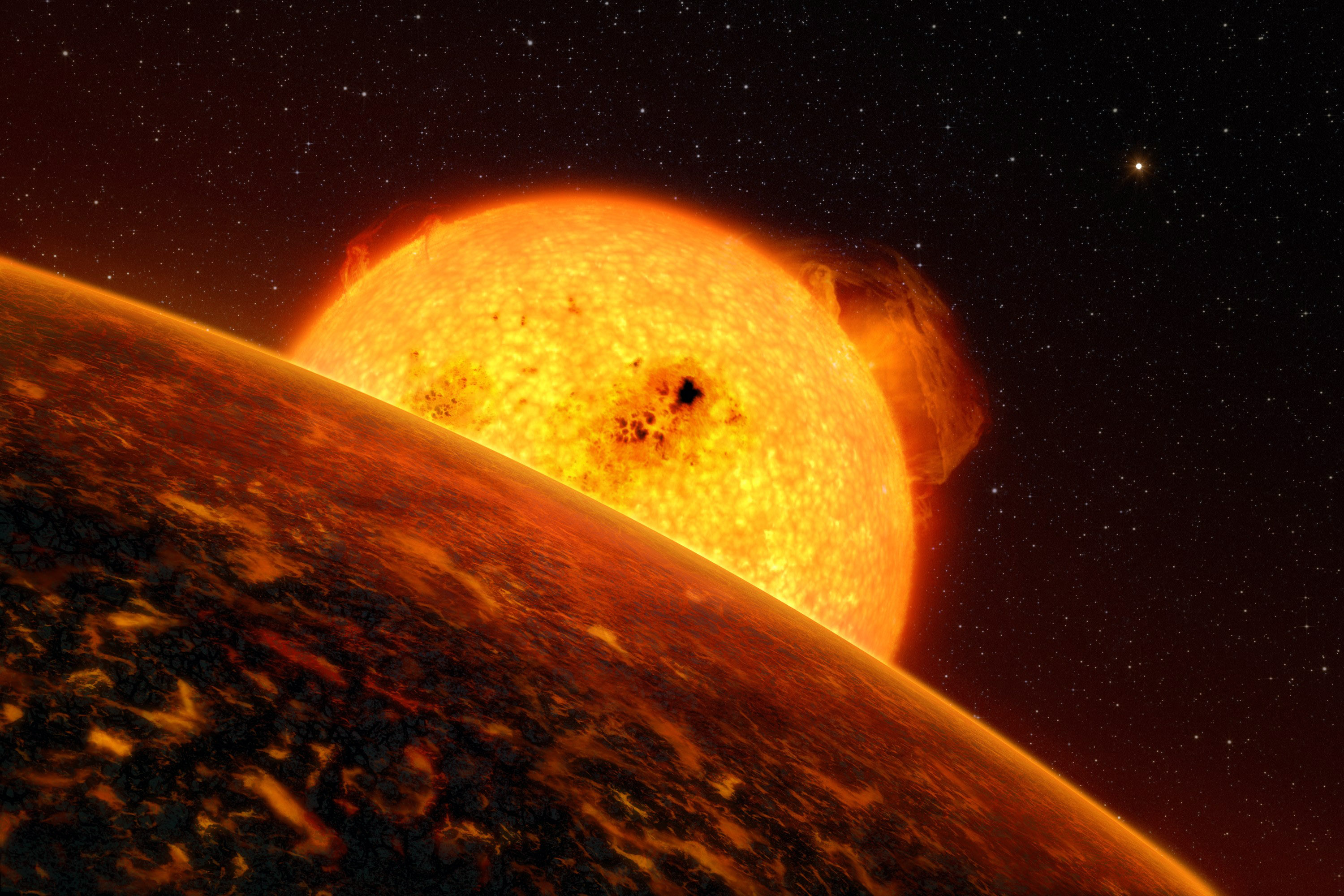
Artist's impression of CoRoT-7b. Credit: ESO/L. Calçada.

CoRoT-7b's mass is somewhat uncertain at 6.06±0.65M_{🜨}, while its radius and orbital period are well known from CoRoT photometry: it orbits very close to its star (1/23rd the distance from the Sun to Mercury) with an orbital period of 20 hours, 29 minutes, and 9.7 seconds and has a radius of 1.58 Earth radii. CoRoT-7b had the shortest orbit of any planet known at the time of its discovery.

Due to the high temperature, it may be covered in lava. The composition and density of the planet, though weakly constrained, make CoRoT-7b a probably rocky planet, like Earth. It could belong to a class of planets that are thought to contain up to 40% water (in the form of ice and/or vapor) in addition to rock. However, the fact that it formed so close to its parent star may mean that it is depleted of volatiles. A strong possibility exists that the planet's rotation is tidally locked to the orbital period, so that temperatures and geologic conditions on the sides of the planet facing towards and away from the star may be dramatically different. Theoretical work suggests that CoRoT-7b could be a chthonian planet (the remains of a Neptune-like planet from which much of the initial mass has been removed due to close proximity to its parent star). Other researchers dispute this, and conclude CoRoT-7b was always a rocky planet and not the eroded core of a gas or ice giant, due to the young age of the star system.

Any departure from circularity of its orbit (due to the influence of host star and neighboring planets) could generate intense volcanic activity similar to that of Io, via tidal heating.

A detailed study of the extreme properties of CoRoT-7b has been published, concluding that, despite the mass uncertainty, the planet is Earth-like in composition. The extreme proximity to the star should prevent the formation of a significant atmosphere, with the dayside hemisphere as hot as the tungsten filament of an incandescent bulb, resulting in the formation of a lava ocean. The researchers propose to name this new class of planets, CoRoT-7b being the first of them, "lava-ocean planets".

=== Model of the interior ===
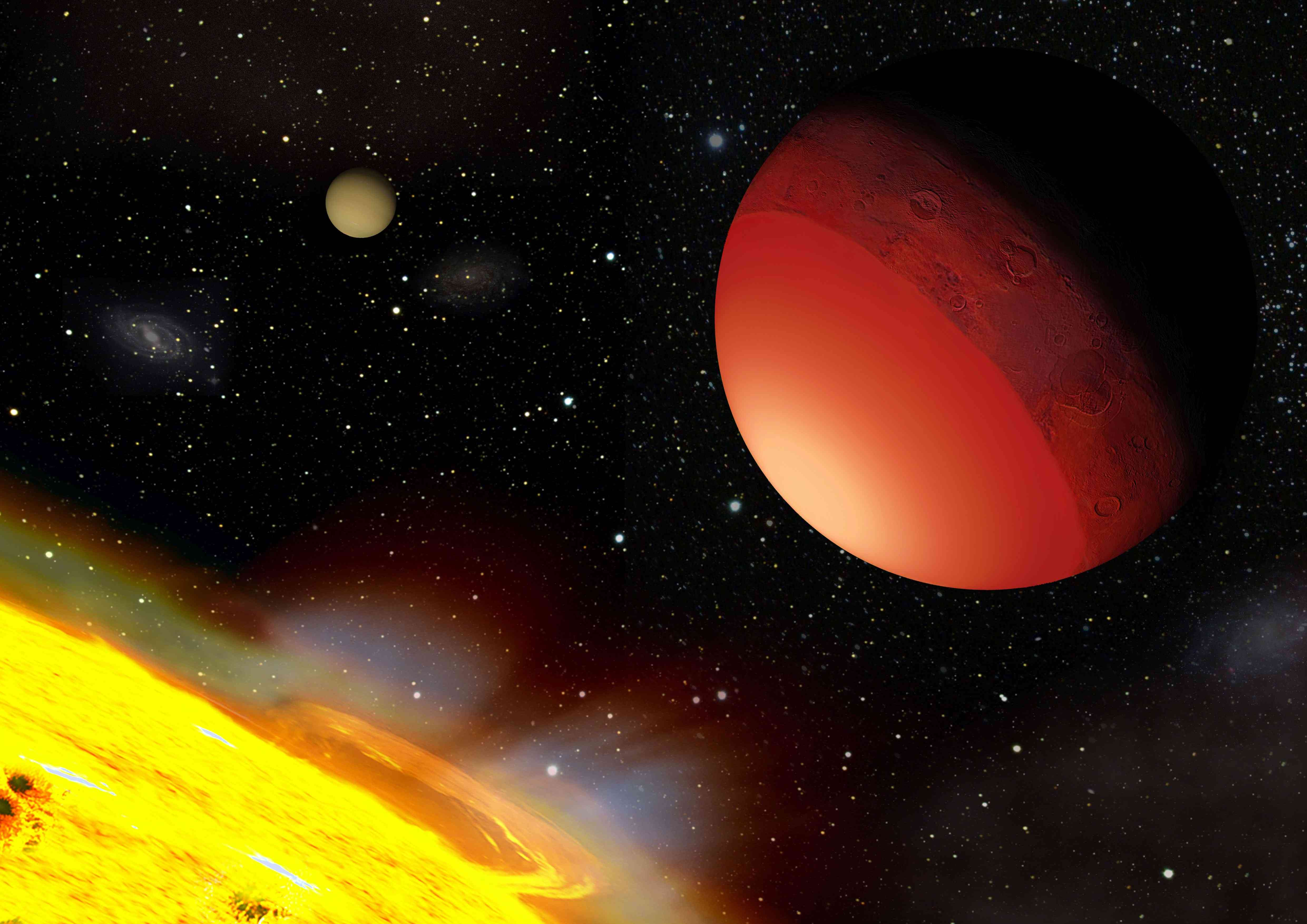
CoRoT-7b artist view.

Assuming a 5-Earth-masses planet, the planet was modeled to have convection in the mantle with a small core with no more than 15% the mass of the planet, or 0.75 M_{🜨}. The lower mantle above the core-mantle boundary has more sluggish convection than the upper mantle because the greater pressure causes fluids to become more viscous. The temperature of the upper convecting mantle is different from one side of the planet to the other with lateral temperature differences for downwellings up to several hundred kelvins. However, the temperature of the upwelling is unaffected by downwelling and surface temperature variations. On the permanent dayside of the tidally locked planet where the surface temperature is hot from continuously facing its sun, the surface takes part in convection, which is the evidence that all the surface of this hemisphere being covered in oceans of lava. On the permanent nightside, the surface is cool enough for the formation of the crust with pools of lava above the convective mantle with intense volcanism. The dayside of the planet has larger convection cells than the nightside. Researchers also investigated the physical state of the interior of CoRoT-7b, indicating as likely a solid iron core, thus a self-generated magnetic field should be absent on the planet.

=== Possible atmosphere ===
Due to the high temperatures on the illuminated side of the planet, and the likelihood that all surface volatiles have been depleted, silicate rock vaporization may have produced a tenuous atmosphere (with a pressure approaching 1 Pa or 10^{−2} mbar at 2,500 K [2,230 °C; 4,040 °F]) consisting predominantly of sodium, O_{2}, O and silicon monoxide, as well as smaller amounts of potassium and other metals. Magnesium (Mg), aluminium (Al), calcium (Ca), silicon (Si), and iron (Fe) may rain out from such an atmosphere on the planet's daylight side in the form of particles of minerals, such as enstatite, corundum and spinel, wollastonite, silica, and iron (II) oxide, that would condense at altitudes below 10 km (6.2 mi). Titanium (Ti) may be depleted (and possibly iron similarly) by being transported towards the night side before condensing as perovskite and geikielite. Sodium (and to a lesser extent, potassium), being more volatile, would be less subject to condensation into clouds and would dominate the outer layers of the atmosphere. Observations carried out with the UVES spectrograph on CoRoT-7b in and out of transit, searching for emission and absorption lines originating in the exosphere of the planet, failed to detect any significant feature. Spectral lines of calcium (Ca I, Ca II) and sodium (Na), expected for a Mercury-like planet, are either absent or below detection limits, and even emission lines expected from volcanic activity, due to tidal forces exerted by the gravity of the nearby star, were not found. The lack of detections is in agreement with the previously cited theoretical work, which points to a cloudless atmosphere made of rocky vapours with a very low pressure. From the data available, scientists can only infer that CoRoT-7b does not resemble any of the rocky planets of the Solar System.

== See also ==
- Chthonian planet
- CoRoT-7c: another close-orbiting super-Earth not detected by CoRoT
- Gliese 1214 b, another exoplanet with well determined radius and mass in the super-Earth range
- High Accuracy Radial Velocity Planet Searcher or High Accuracy Radial Velocity Planet Search
- Kepler-10b, another exoplanet determined to be rocky
- Spitzer Space Telescope
