= V901 Orionis =

Variable star in the constellation Orion

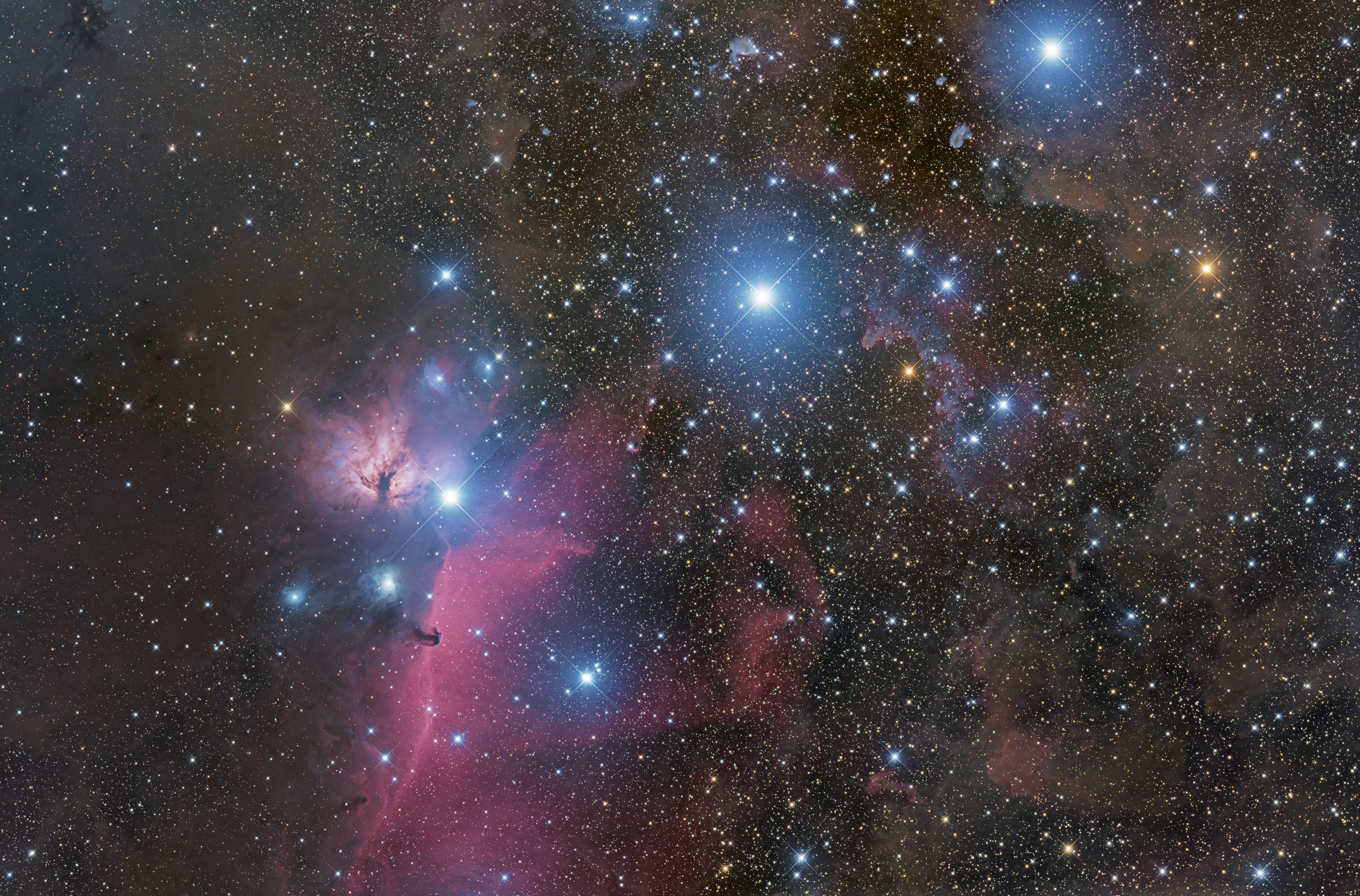
- Location of V901 Orionis (circled in red) just north of Alnitak in Orion's Belt

Observation data Epoch J2000.0 Equinox ICRS
- Constellation: Orion
- Right ascension: 23^{h} 57^{m} 58.477^{s}
- Declination: +15° 57′ 10.09″
- Apparent magnitude (V): 6.97 to 7.02

Characteristics
- Evolutionary stage: main sequence
- Spectral type: B2V
- B−V color index: −0.139±0.007
- Variable type: SX Ari

Astrometry
Radial velocity (R_{v})	14.66±0.25 km/s
Proper motion (μ)	RA: 2.743 mas/yr Dec.: 1.671 mas/yr
Parallax (π)	2.5463±0.0524 mas
Distance	1,280 ± 30 ly (393 ± 8 pc)
Absolute magnitude (M_{V})	−0.77

Details
Mass	8.3±0.3 M_{☉}
Radius	3.2 R_{☉}
Luminosity	1,995^{+823}_{−583} L_{☉}
Surface gravity (log g)	4.04±0.01 cgs
Temperature	22,000±1,000 K
Rotation	1.539 days
Rotational velocity (v sin i)	101 km/s
Age	3.98 Myr

Other designations
- Landstreet's star, V901 Ori, BD−01°1005, HD 37776, HIP 26742, SAO 132446, PPM 175998

Database references
SIMBAD	data

V901 Orionis is a variable star in the equatorial constellation of Orion. It is sometimes known as Landstreet's Star and has the designation HD 37776 from the Henry Draper Catalogue; V901 Ori is the variable star designation. With an apparent visual magnitude that varies around seven, it is a challenge to view with the naked eye. Based on parallax measurements from Earth, it is located at a distance of 1,280 ± 30 light-years (393 ± 8 pc). The star is drifting further away from the Sun with a radial velocity of 15 km/s.

== Properties ==
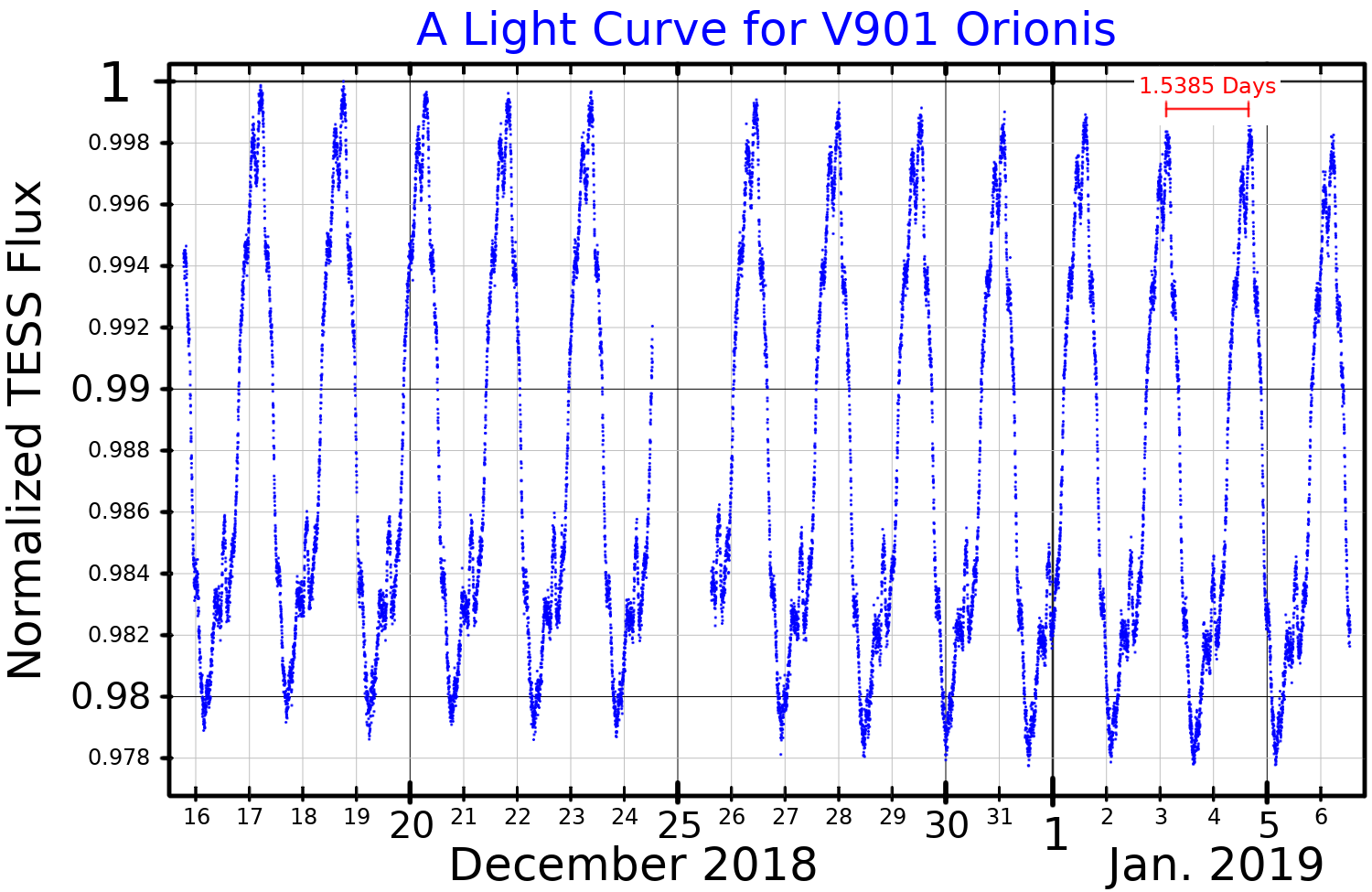
A light curve for V901 Orionis, plotted from TESS data. The 1.5385 day period is marked in red.

This object was found to be a helium-rich variable star in 1976. It was shown to have a high rotation rate and display an infrared excess. Magnetic field measurements showed a multipole distribution and a period of 1.5 days. This was the first star discovered in which a quadrupole-like geometry of the magnetic field dominated over the dipole field found in most stars.

In 2007, HD 37776 was discovered to undergo change in rotation, probably due to loss of angular momentum from a magnetically-confined stellar wind. The rotational braking in this star is 0.54±0.02 s per year, a record level for magnetic chemically-peculiar stars. Surprisingly, a long-term study of the rotation period showed a steady increase until 2003, after which the period began to decrease. This may be the result of an interaction between a thin, magnetically-confined outer envelope and a faster rotating inner body.

This is a massive, helium-strong, magnetic chemically peculiar star with a stellar classification of B2V. It is classified as an SX Arietis variable that ranges in visual magnitude from 6.97 to 7.02 with a period of 1.5385 days. The light variation is believed due to uneven surface distribution of helium and silicon. The topology of the magnetic field is the most complex ever found for an early-type star (i.e. a higher mass main sequence star).

Stellar models paint this as a young star with an estimated age of four million years, that is spinning with a projected rotational velocity of 101 km/s. It has an estimated 8.3 times the mass of the Sun and 3.2 times the Sun's radius. The star is radiating nearly 2,000 times the luminosity of the Sun from its photosphere at an effective temperature of around 22,000

HD 37776 is a member of the Orion OB1 association of co-moving stars and is embedded in the emission nebula IC 432. It is a candidate member of the Orion B Complex star forming region.
