= V957 Scorpii =

Star in the constellation Scorpius

- Location of V957 Scorpii (circled)

Observation data Epoch J2000 Equinox ICRS
- Constellation: Scorpius
- Right ascension: 17^{h} 52^{m} 13.662^{s}
- Declination: −34° 47′ 57.11″
- Apparent magnitude (V): 5.87

Characteristics
- Evolutionary stage: blue straggler
- Spectral type: B5 IIIp
- U−B color index: −0.64
- B−V color index: −0.10
- Variable type: SX Ari

Astrometry
Radial velocity (R_{v})	−9.70 km/s
Proper motion (μ)	RA: 3.148 mas/yr Dec.: −5.604 mas/yr
Parallax (π)	3.6766±0.1521 mas
Distance	890 ± 40 ly (270 ± 10 pc)
Absolute magnitude (M_{V})	−1.441

Details
Mass	5.13 M_{☉}
Radius	4.00 R_{☉}
Luminosity	1,148 L_{☉}
Surface gravity (log g)	3.94 cgs
Temperature	16,600 K
Metallicity [Fe/H]	+0.01 dex
Rotational velocity (v sin i)	30 km/s
Age	50 Myr

Other designations
- V957 Sco, HR 6647, HD 162374, CD−34°12165, SAO 209383, HIP 87460

Database references
SIMBAD	data

V957 Scorpii is a variable star in the constellation of Scorpius. It is a blue straggler in the open cluster Messier 7, a star that is unexpectedly hot compared to other members of the cluster. A 6th magnitude star, it is faintly visible to the naked eye under very good observing conditions.

== Spectrum ==
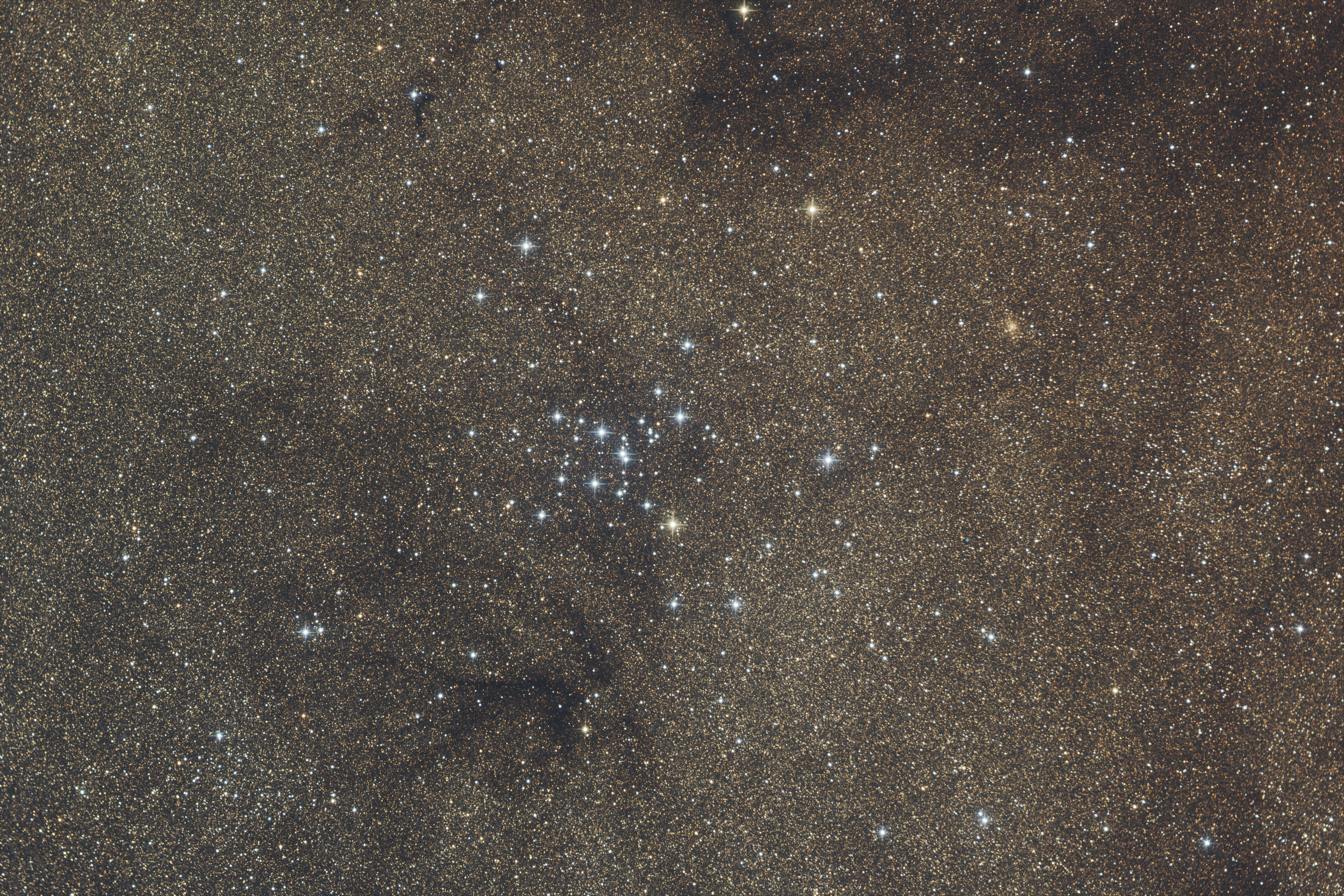
Messier 7 (M7), with V957 Scorpii the bright white star to the right of the central square

V957 Scorpii shows a peculiar B5 or B6 spectrum. Its luminosity class has been given as main sequence (V), subgiant (IV), giant (III), and supergiant (Ib). From its position in the H-R diagram, it is actually thought to be a main sequence star. With a helium abundance 25 times lower than that of the sun, it is classified as helium-weak. It also has a low carbon abundance and a strong magnetic field.

== Messier 7 ==
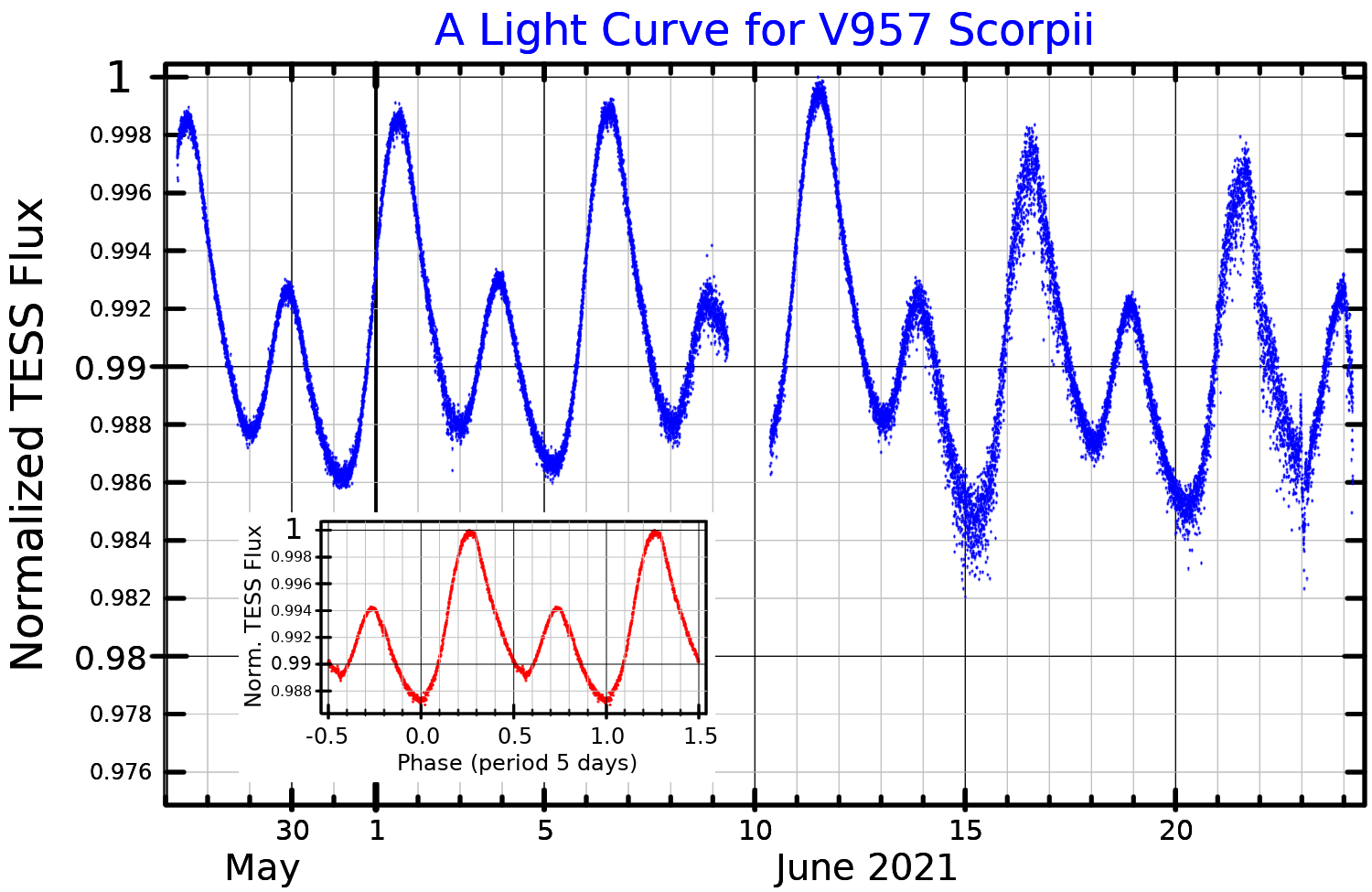
A light curve for V957 Scorpii, plotted from TESS data. The inset plot shows the same data averaged over several cycles.

Messier 7 is a naked eye open cluster. Except for one obvious orange giant star, most of its brightest members are mostly early A and late B main sequence stars and giants. Several of them are also chemically peculiar stars. However, two stars are hotter than the others and lie to the left of the isochrone for the cluster. These are the blue stragglers HD 162586 and V957 Scorpii. V957 Scorpii is considered 92% likely to be a member of M7. M7 has an age around 220 million years, but the apparent age of V957 Scorpii is less than 100 million years.

== Variability ==
Pierre Louis North announced that the star is a variable star, in 1984. It was given its variable star designation in 1987. V957 Scorpii varies in brightness by about 0.05 magnitudes. This is thought to be due to its rotation and variations in its surface brightness. It is classified as an SX Arietis variable, also known as helium variables. Their spectral lines also vary as the stars rotate.
