= HD 66051 =

Binary star in the constellation Puppis

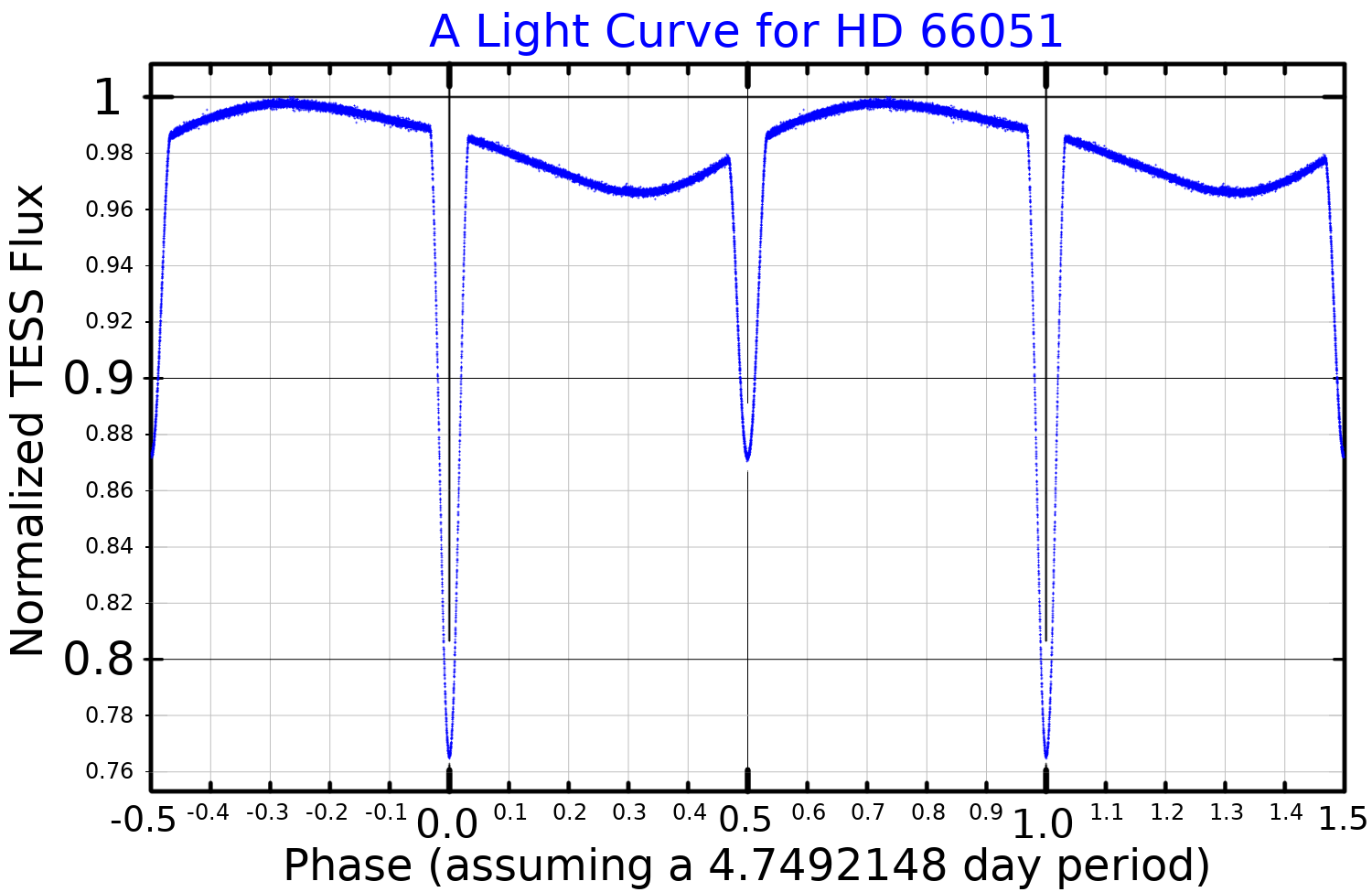
- A light curve for HD 66051, plotted from TESS data, showing the rotationally-modulated variation combined with dips during eclipses.

Observation data Epoch J2000.0 Equinox ICRS
- Constellation: Puppis
- Right ascension: 08^{h} 01^{m} 24.642^{s}
- Declination: −12° 47′ 35.74″
- Apparent magnitude (V): 8.81 (8.80 to 9.12)

Characteristics
- Evolutionary stage: main sequence + main sequence
- Spectral type: ApSi
- B−V color index: −0.053±0.005
- Variable type: Algol + α^{2} CVn

Astrometry
Proper motion (μ)	RA: −0.278 mas/yr Dec.: −1.345 mas/yr
Parallax (π)	1.506±0.034 mas
Distance	2,170 ± 50 ly (660 ± 10 pc)
Absolute bolometric magnitude (M_{bol})	−0.62±0.16, +1.81±0.12

Orbit
Period (P)	4.749218 d
Semi-major axis (a)	20.370±0.004 R_{☉}
Eccentricity (e)	0.0 (fixed)
Inclination (i)	84.7±0.1°
Longitude of the node (Ω)	8.50±0.09°
Periastron epoch (T)	2452167.867 HJD
Argument of periastron (ω) (secondary)	0.0°
Semi-amplitude (K_{1}) (primary)	77.24±0.60 km/s
Semi-amplitude (K_{2}) (secondary)	137.97±0.90 km/s

Details
Age	< 120 Myr

Primary
Mass	3.155±0.060 M_{☉}
Radius	2.781±0.034 R_{☉}
Surface gravity (log g)	4.049±0.011 cgs
Temperature	13,000±300 K
Rotational velocity (v sin i)	30.5±1.1 km/s

Secondary
Mass	1.751±0.039 M_{☉}
Radius	1.390±0.042 R_{☉}
Surface gravity (log g)	4.395±0.021 cgs
Temperature	9,000±150 K
Rotational velocity (v sin i)	19.1±0.9 km/s

Other designations
- V414 Pup, BD−12°2280, FK5 4720, HD 66051, HIP 39229, SAO 153725, PPM 219538

Database references
SIMBAD	data

HD 66051 is an eclipsing binary star system with a magnetically active component in the southern constellation of Puppis. It has the variable star designation V414 Pup; HD 66051 is its identifier from the Henry Draper Catalogue. With a typical apparent visual magnitude of 8.81, it is too faint to be visible to the naked eye. Based on an annual parallax shift of 1.5 mas, it is located at a distance of approximately 2,170 ly from the Earth.

== Observations ==
This was identified as a peculiar A star with anomalous lines of silicon during a spectroscopic survey of southern skies begun in 1967, with preliminary results reported in 1973. Data from the Hipparcos satellite demonstrated it is a variable star. It was formally classified as Ap Si in 1978, indicating a chemically-peculiar star. In 2003, further data showed this is an eclipsing binary system of the Algol type and an Alpha2 Canum Venaticorum variable. The period of both variations is the same, 4.74922 days, and it is locked in synchronous rotation.

HD 66051 is a double-lined spectroscopic binary. It is a young star system with components that are near zero-age main sequence. The pair have an orbital period of 4.75 days in a circular orbit, with a separation of 20.4 times the radius of the Sun. The orbital plane is inclined at an angle of 84.7° to the plane of the sky, allowing their mutual eclipses to be viewed from Earth. During the primary eclipse, the visual magnitude of the pair decreases from 8.79 to 9.12. The secondary eclipse decreases the visual magnitude to 8.94.

The composition of the more massive primary component is highly peculiar and somewhat resembles a mercury-manganese star, although it does not belong to that class. It shows depletion in certain light elements, including helium, carbon, magnesium, and aluminium. In contrast, it is overabundant in heavy elements and all members of the iron group except nickel. Silicon and phosphorus are also high in abundance. The resulting stellar classification is kB9 hB7 V He-w SiCrSrEuHg, indicating this is a helium-weak star. It has a magnetic field with a dipole component that is inclined 13° to the pole of rotation, and a polar field strength of 600 G.

The primary is a magnetic chemically peculiar Bp star with a non-uniform distribution of elements across its surface. It was the first early-type magnetic star to be found in an eclipsing binary system. These chemical spots create a variability in the spectrum as the star rotates. It has 3.2 times the mass of the Sun and 2.8 times the Sun's radius. The rotation rate is synchronized with the orbital period of 4.75 days.

The secondary is an Am star, displaying a metallic-lined spectrum, but lacks a magnetic field and its spectra does not vary. It has 1.75 times the mass of the Sun and 1.39 times the Sun's radius.
