= HD 142990 =

Star in the constellation Scorpius

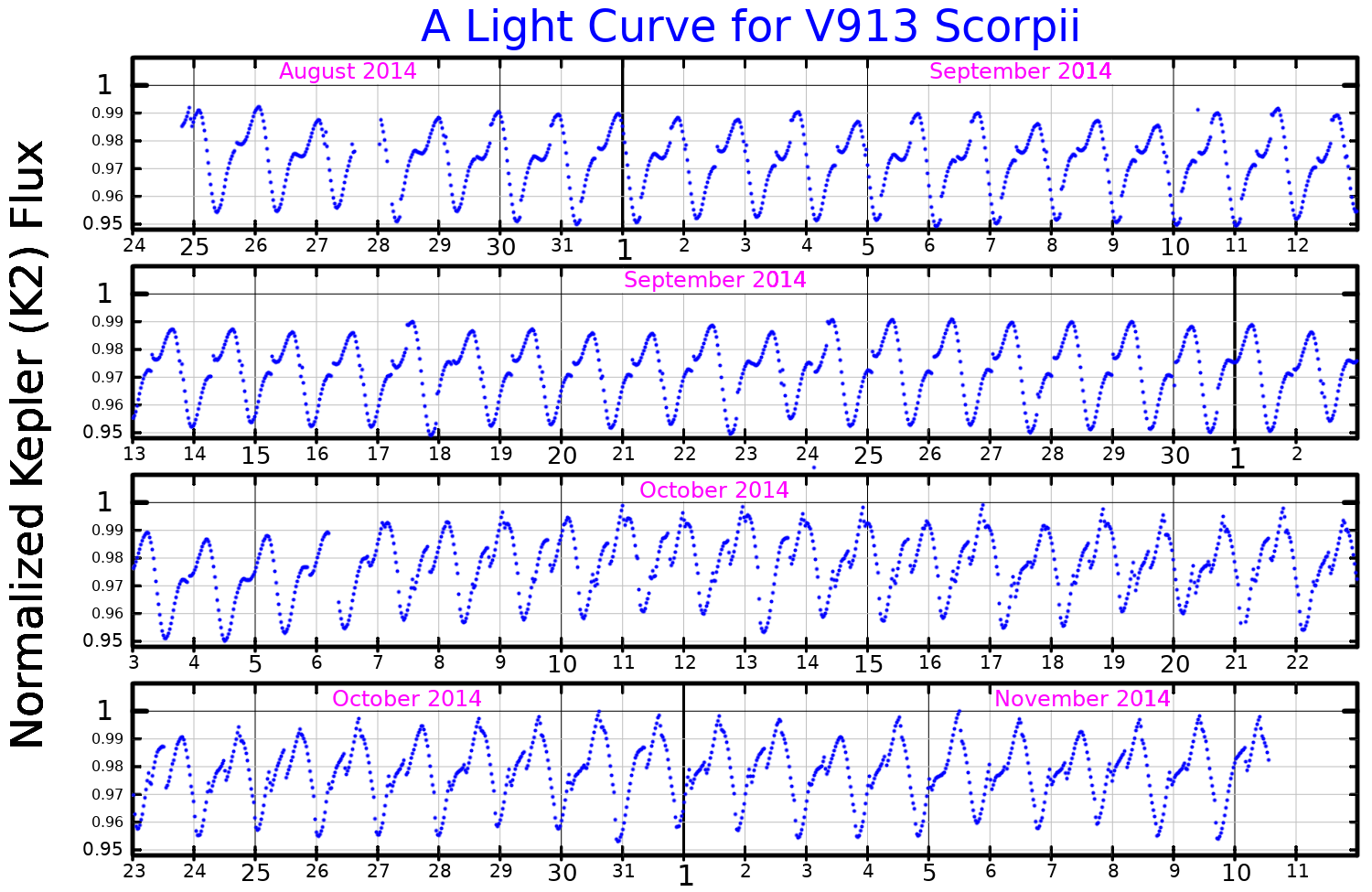
- A light curve for V913 Scorpii, plotted from Kepler K2 data.

Observation data Epoch J2000.0 Equinox ICRS
- Constellation: Scorpius
- Right ascension: 15^{h} 58^{m} 34.86657^{s}
- Declination: −24° 49′ 53.3617″
- Apparent magnitude (V): 5.40 - 5.47

Characteristics
- Spectral type: B5 V
- U−B color index: -0.65
- B−V color index: -0.09
- Variable type: SXARI

Astrometry
Proper motion (μ)	RA: −12.451±0.100 mas/yr Dec.: −24.582±0.061 mas/yr
Parallax (π)	7.0050±0.0908 mas
Distance	466 ± 6 ly (143 ± 2 pc)

Details
Mass	5.7±0.1 M_{☉}
Radius	2.80±0.04 R_{☉}
Luminosity	794 L_{☉}
Surface gravity (log g)	4.15±0.11 cgs
Temperature	18000±500 K
Rotation	0.978832±0.000002 d
Rotational velocity (v sin i)	122±2 km/s
Age	5.0+1.3 −1.0 Myr

Other designations
- V913 Sco, HR 5942, HIP 78246, SAO 183982

Database references
SIMBAD	data

HD 142990, also known as HR 5942 and V913 Scorpii, is a star about 470 light years from the Earth, in the constellation Scorpius. It is a 5th magnitude star, so it will be faintly visible to the naked eye of an observer far from city lights. It is a variable star, whose brightness varies slightly from 5.40 to 5.47 during its 23.5 hour rotation period. It is a member of the Upper Scorpius Region of the Scorpius–Centaurus association.

HD 142990 is a helium-weak star. In 1983, Ermanno Borra et al. detected the star's strong (~kilogauss) magnetic field from the Zeeman splitting of the Hβ spectral line. Later estimates put the field strength as several kilogauss.

The variability of HD 142990 was discovered in 1977 by Holger Pedersen and Bjarne Thomsen, during a spectroscopic and photometric study of helium weak and helium strong stars. In 1978 the star was given the variable star designation V913 Scorpii. Far more extensive photometric data were provided by the Kepler K2 program, which sampled the light curve well, and allowed Dominic Bowman et al. to measure the star's 0.978832±0.000002 day rotation period.

The rotation period of HD 142990 appears to be decreasing at a rate of about 0.6 seconds per year. This might mean the star is still contracting towards the zero-age main sequence, though other explanations involving magnetohydrodynamics have been proposed.

In 1989, Jeffrey Linsky et al. reported the detection of 6 cm radio emission from HD 142990, which appeared to be variable on a time scale of 5 minutes. In 2018, Emil Lenc et al. found that the radio emission from the star is circularly polarized. In 2019, Barnali Das et al. reported that HD 142990 exhibits coherent electron cyclotron maser emission at 200 MHz, making it, at that time, only the fourth hot magnetic star known to emit by this mechanism .
