= HD 133880 =

Variable star in the constellation Lupus

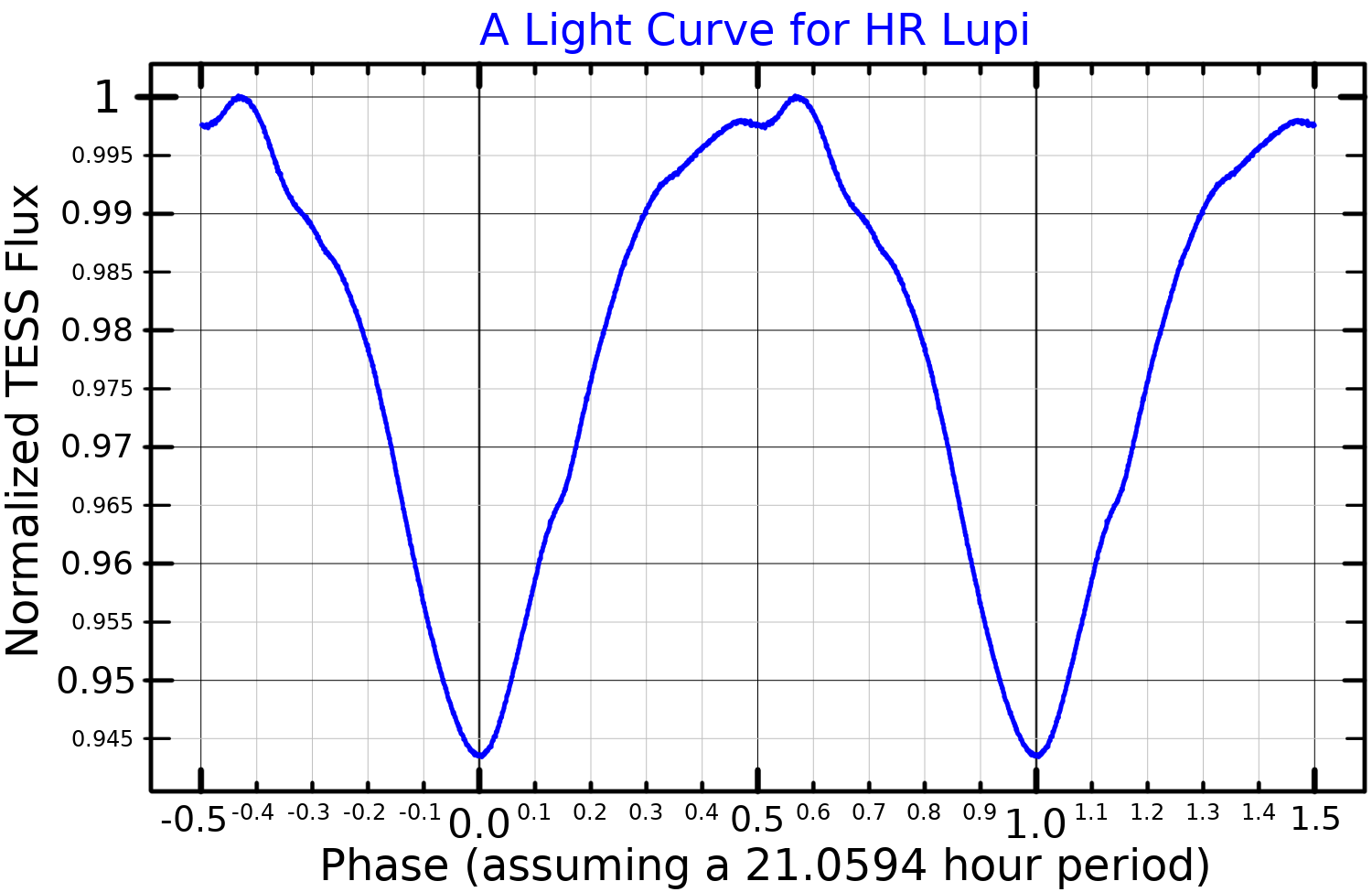
- A light curve for HR Lupi, plotted from TESS data

Observation data Epoch J2000.0 Equinox ICRS
- Constellation: Lupus
- Right ascension: 15^{h} 08^{m} 12.12388^{s}
- Declination: −40° 35′ 02.1554″
- Apparent magnitude (V): 5.76 - 5.81

Characteristics
- Evolutionary stage: main sequence
- Spectral type: B8IVp Si λ4200
- Variable type: SX Arietis

Astrometry
Proper motion (μ)	RA: −28.686±0.085 mas/yr Dec.: −31.533±0.071 mas/yr
Parallax (π)	9.4922±0.0786 mas
Distance	344 ± 3 ly (105.3 ± 0.9 pc)
Absolute magnitude (M_{V})	0.53

Details
Mass	3.20±0.15 M_{☉}
Radius	2.01±0.32 R_{☉}
Luminosity	105 L_{☉}
Surface gravity (log g)	4.28 cgs
Temperature	13,000±600 K
Rotational velocity (v sin i)	103±10 km/s
Age	16+4 −3 Myr

Other designations
- HR Lupi, HIP 74066, HR 5624, SAO 225474

Database references
SIMBAD	data

HD 133880, also known as HR 5624 and HR Lupi, is a Bp star about 340 light years from the Earth, in the constellation Lupus. It is a 5th magnitude star, and will be faintly visible to the naked eye of an observer far from city lights. It is an SX Arietis variable star, varying from magnitude 5.76 to 5.81 over a period of 21.0594 hours. HD 133880 is a member of the Upper Centaurus–Lupus association. It is a young star, estimated to have completed only 5±2 percent of its projected main sequence lifetime. It is one of the few stars known to produce coherent pulsed radio radiation via electron cyclotron maser emission.

The spectrum of HD 133880 matches a B8 subgiant, but with unusually strong absorption lines of some metals, making it a member of the chemically peculiar Ap/Bp star class. For this particular star, silicon lines at 4,200 Å are notably strong. Its rotation rate is unusually fast for a star of this type.

In 1985, Christoffel Waelkens found that HD 133880 is a variable star with a period of 0.87746±0.00001 days, varying by 0.15, 0.10 and 0.06 magnitudes in the U, B and V bands respectively. In 1986, the star was given the variable star designation HR Lupi. Later measurements of the period varied significantly, and can only be reconciled if the period varies in time.

In 1990, John Landstreet found that HD 133880 has a very strong (several kG) magnetic field, with the unusual property that its quadrupole term is stronger than the dipole term. However a study in 2017 found the magnetic field was better described as a distorted asymmetric dipole, with a maximum strength of 12 kG, and an average strength of 4 kG.

Much of the research interest in HD 133880 arises from its radio emissions. Jeremy Lim et al. observed the star with the Australia Telescope Compact Array in 1995, and found that because the star's magnetic and rotation axes are not aligned, the 6 cm wavelength radiation they measured showed variation in both strength and polarization as the star rotated. In 2018 Barnali Das et al. detected electron cyclotron maser emission from the star at 610 MHz, using the GMRT. HD 133880 was the second star found to radiate in this way (after CU Virginis). The radiation was found to vary by an order of magnitude as the star rotated, and had roughly 100 percent right circular polarization when the emission peaked.
