= HD 28843 =

Variable star in the constellation Eridanus

- Location of HD 28843 (circled)

Observation data Epoch J2000.0 Equinox ICRS
- Constellation: Eridanus
- Right ascension: 04^{h} 32^{m} 37.55373^{s}
- Declination: −03° 12′ 34.3448″
- Apparent magnitude (V): 5.70 - 5.84

Characteristics
- Evolutionary stage: main sequence
- Spectral type: B9III
- U−B color index: −0.55
- B−V color index: −0.14
- Variable type: SX Arietis

Astrometry
Radial velocity (R_{v})	18±7 km/s
Proper motion (μ)	RA: 18.227±0.068 mas/yr Dec.: −16.177±0.054 mas/yr
Parallax (π)	5.8958±0.0608 mas
Distance	553 ± 6 ly (170 ± 2 pc)
Absolute magnitude (M_{V})	−0.7

Details
Mass	4.20±0.6 M_{☉}
Radius	3.4 R_{☉}
Luminosity	324+57 −48 L_{☉}
Surface gravity (log g)	3.86 cgs
Temperature	14800±200 K
Metallicity [Fe/H]	−0.166 dex
Rotation	1.37381±0.00001 d
Rotational velocity (v sin i)	91 km/s

Other designations
- DZ Eri, HR 1441, HIP 21192, SAO 131279

Database references
SIMBAD	data

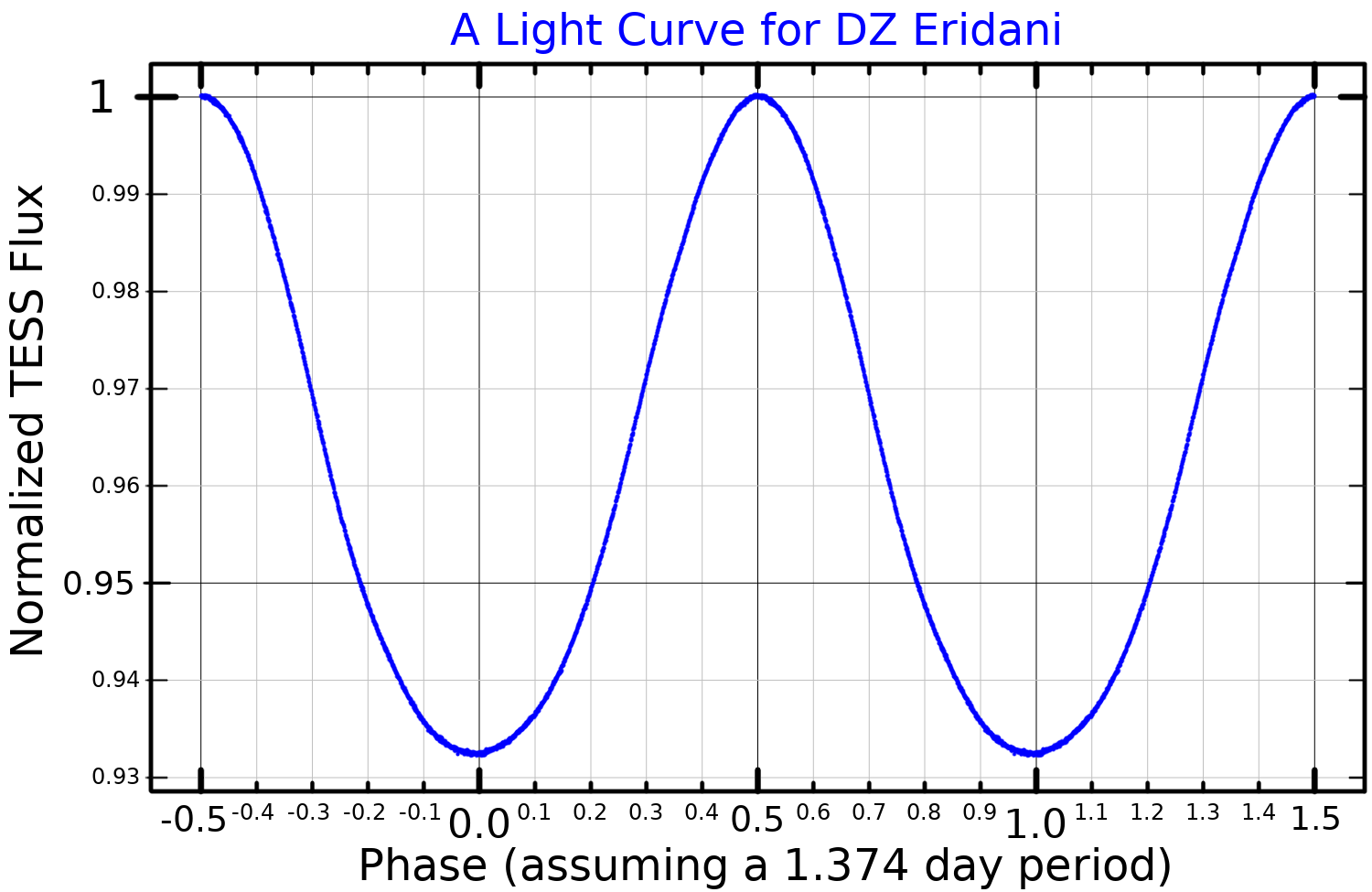
A light curve for DZ Eridani, plotted from TESS data

HD 28843, also known as HR 1441 and DZ Eridani, is a star about 550 light years from the Earth, in the constellation Eridanus. It is a 5th magnitude star, so it will be faintly visible to the naked eye of an observer far from city lights. It is a variable star, whose brightness varies slightly from 5.70 to 5.84 during its 1.374 day rotation period. It is a member of the μ Tauri Association, a group of young stars within the larger Cassiopeia-Taurus Structure.

In 1969 Mercedes Jaschek et al. determined that HD 28843 is a helium-weak star, based on its B-V color index being bluer (more negative) than would be expected for a star with its spectral type. In 1977, Robert Davis reported that the star has an overabundance of silicon. It is classified as a chemically peculiar star.

Henning Jorgensen et al. reported that HD 28843 was a "suspected variable star" in 1971. The variability of the star was firmly established in 1977 by Holger Pedersen and Bjarne Thomsen, during a spectroscopic and photometric study of helium weak and helium strong stars. They determined its period to be 1.374±0.006 days. In 1978 the star was given the variable star designation DZ Eridani.

Ermanno Borra et al. reported in 1983 the detection of the magnetic field of HD 28843, and estimated its strength to be a few hundred gauss. Later data from the International Ultraviolet Explorer implied a field strength of 250 gauss.

M. Farthmann et al. reported in 1994 that high spectral resolution observations of the 4471Å spectral line of neutral helium can be explained if HD 28843 has two helium-enriched circular "caps" separated by a region with a dramatically lower helium abundance.
