= HD 191612 =

Binary star in the constellation Cygnus

Observation data Epoch J2000.0 Equinox ICRS
- Constellation: Cygnus
- Right ascension: 20^{h} 09^{m} 28.611^{s}
- Declination: +35° 44′ 01.29″
- Apparent magnitude (V): 7.84 – 7.91

Characteristics
- Spectral type: O6.5f?pe–O8fp (O8fp + B1V)
- B−V color index: 0.197±0.012
- Variable type: SX Ari?

Astrometry
Radial velocity (R_{v})	−27.60±3.3 km/s
Proper motion (μ)	RA: −3.164 mas/yr Dec.: −5.693 mas/yr
Parallax (π)	0.5362±0.0244 mas
Distance	6,100 ± 300 ly (1,860 ± 80 pc)

Orbit
Period (P)	1,542±14 d
Semi-major axis (a)	≥ 322±24 R_{☉}
Eccentricity (e)	0.438±0.038
Periastron epoch (T)	2,453,720±20 JD
Argument of periastron (ω) (secondary)	344.7±6.5°
Semi-amplitude (K_{1}) (primary)	11.77±0.84 km/s
Semi-amplitude (K_{2}) (secondary)	24.4±1.4 km/s

Details

Primary
Mass	~30 M_{☉}
Radius	14.5 R_{☉}
Luminosity	250,000 L_{☉}
Surface gravity (log g)	3.5±0.1 cgs
Temperature	35,000±1,000 K
Rotation	537.6 d
Rotational velocity (v sin i)	≤ 60 km/s
Age	3–4 Myr

Secondary
Mass	~15 M_{☉}

Other designations
- V2523 Cygni, BD+35°3995, HD 191612, HIP 99308, SAO 69520, PPM 84335

Database references
SIMBAD	data

HD 191612 is a binary star system in the northern constellation of Cygnus, the swan. Based on parallax measurements, it is located at a distance of 6,100 light years from the Sun. It has an apparent visual magnitude of 7.81, which is too faint to be readily visible with the naked eye, requiring a small telescope to view. HD 191612 is drifting closer with a heliocentric radial velocity of −28 km/s. It lies within the Cygnus OB 3 association of recently formed stars.

== Observations ==
The Of?p stellar classification was first proposed by American astronomer N. R. Walborn in 1972. This rare class consists of hot, massive O-type stars with a peculiar spectrum displaying P Cygni profile hydrogen lines plus specific emission lines for doubly-ionized carbon and nitrogen atoms that are comparable in strength. In 1973, the star HD 191612 was included in this group by Walborn with a class of O6.5f?pe, suggesting it is host to a spherically expanding shell.

In 1989, this star was tentatively identified as an X-ray source using the Einstein Observatory. The X-ray luminosity of this star is relatively high, comparable to some X-ray binaries with accreting companions. When combined with the unique spectral features, this suggested an orbiting collapsed star was colliding with the stellar wind from the primary and creating X-ray emitting shocks.

A study of massive OB stars in 1992 found a class (O6.5 III f) for HD 191612 that was different from the one reported by Walborn in 1972. This led to a 2003 study that showed HD 191612 alternated between two spectral states. At least four of these transformations had been observed since 1950. These changes did not occur over short time periods and no radial velocity variations were observed, which mostly ruled out an interacting binary system as the cause.

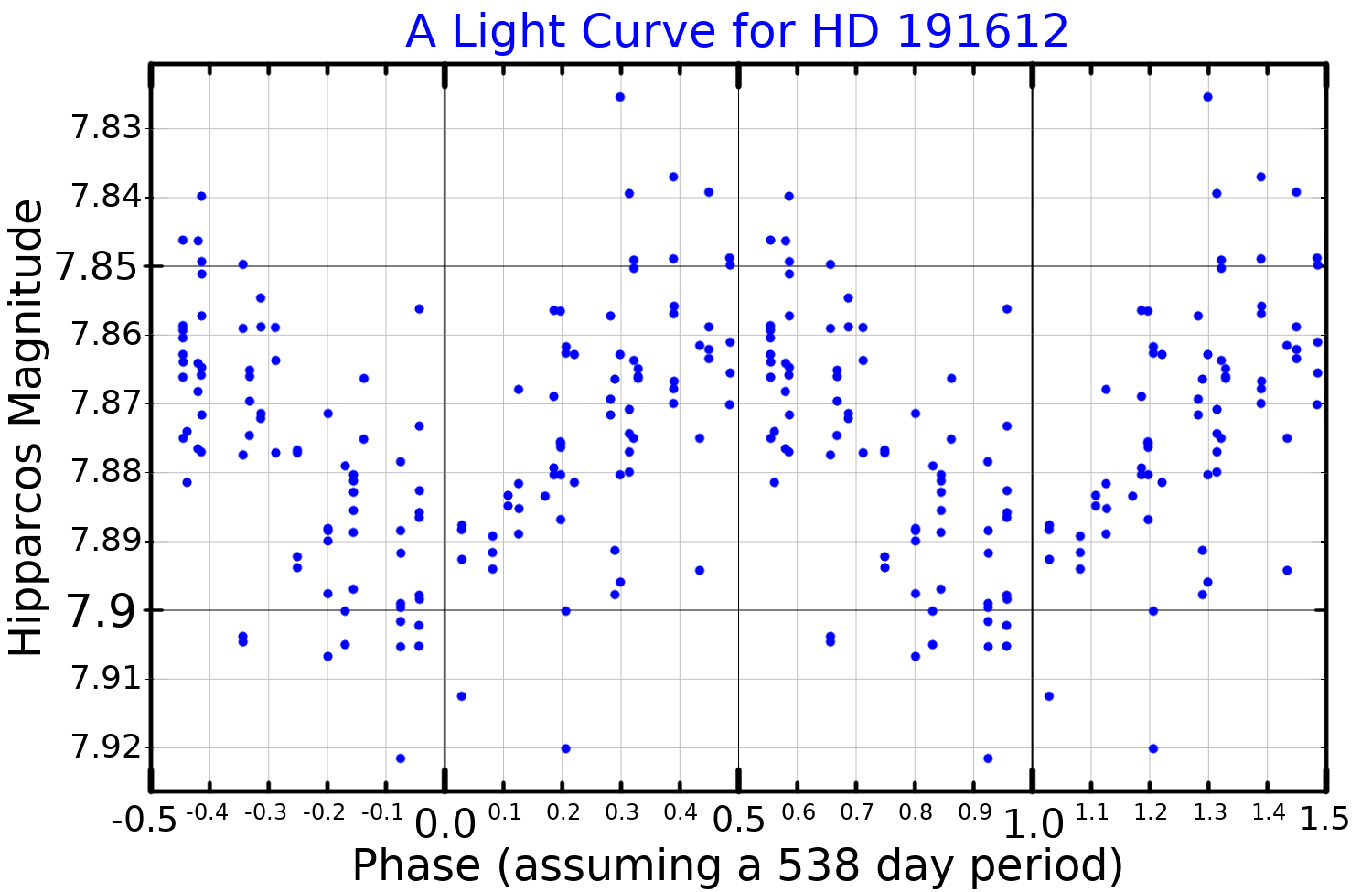
A light curve for HD 191612, plotted from Hipparcos data, folded with the 538 day period from the GCVS

A periodic, symmetrical, low amplitude light curve was reported by the Hipparcos satellite. This showed a cycle time of ~540 d, which seemed too long to be explained by normal rotation or pulsation. The reported period successfully predicted the observed spectral changes. In 2006, a magnetic field was discovered based on a Zeeman signature in the spectrum of HD 191612. This was only the second O-type star found to have a strong magnetic field, after Theta^{1} Orionis C. The polar field strength was estimated at −1.5 kG. This detection suggested that the rotation of the star may have been significantly slowed through confinement of the stellar wind by the magnetic field.

By 2007, long term spectroscopic observations had shown systematic variations in the radial velocity that did not match the light curve period. Instead, these suggested a binary star system with an orbital period of 1,542±14 d and an eccentricity of 0.438±0.038. The observations were consistent with a B-type main sequence companion having about half the mass of the primary.

In 2011, the magnetic field of the primary was confirmed and was found to vary with a period of 537.6 d, matching the spectral variation. This finding supported a dipole oblique rotator model, with the magnetic field oriented at an angle to the stellar poles. With an adopted axial tilt of 30°, the best fit model has a polar magnetic field strength of 2,450±400 G and an obliquity of 67°±5°. The magnetic braking time of 0.33 Myr is much lower than the star's estimated age of 3–4 Myr, demonstrating that this effect is sufficient to produce the inferred slow rotation period of 537.6 d.

The strong stellar wind of this star made star spots less likely as a source of its photometric variability. Instead, it may due to light absorption by circumstellar clouds, in combination with wind blanketing under the influence of the magnetic field.
