= 56 Arietis =

Star in the constellation Aries

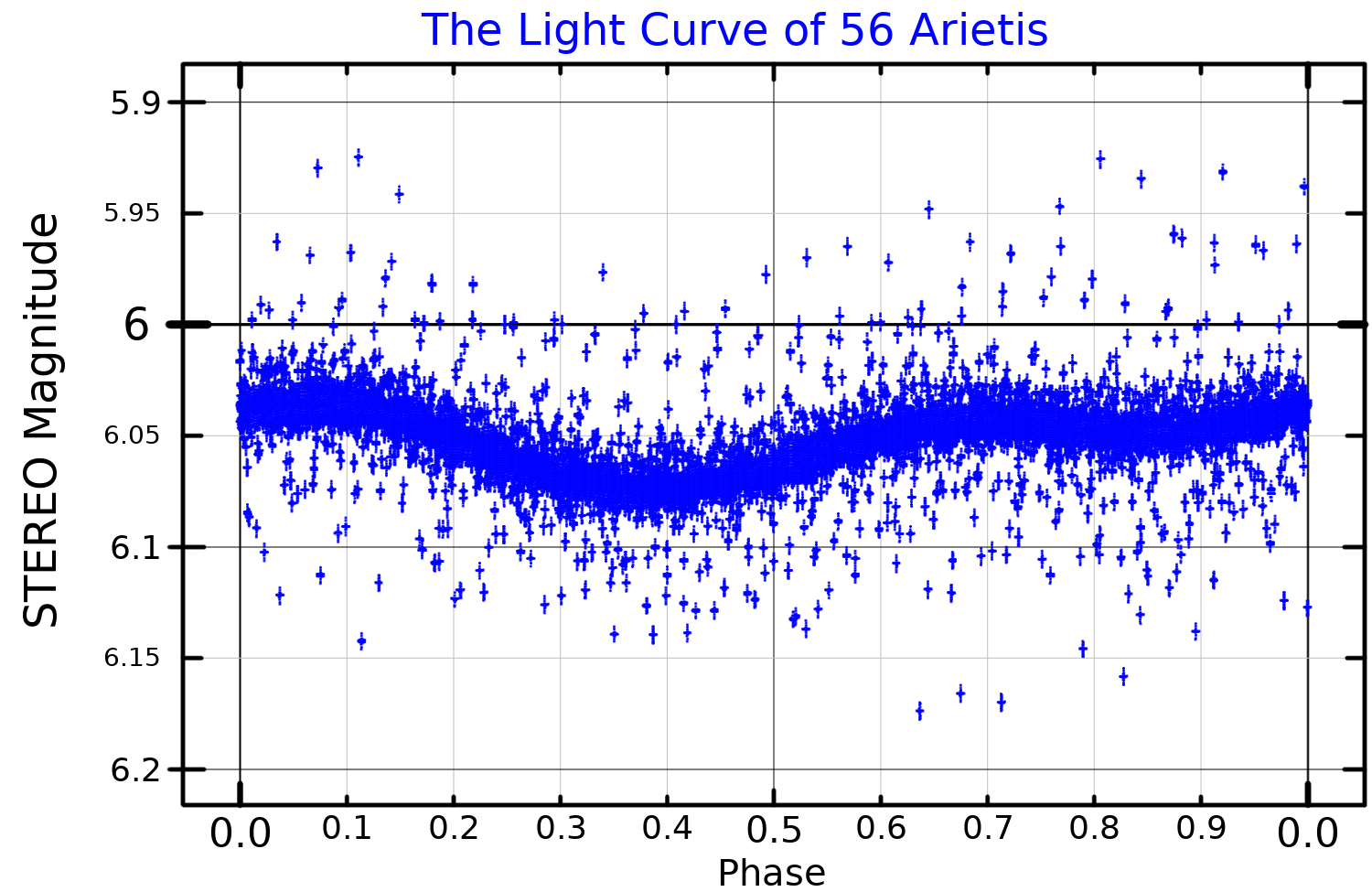
- A light curve for 56 Arietis from STEREO spacecraft data. Adapted from Wraight et al. (2012)

Observation data Epoch J2000 Equinox ICRS
- Constellation: Aries
- Right ascension: 03^{h} 12^{m} 14.2461^{s}
- Declination: +27° 15′ 25.086″
- Apparent magnitude (V): 5.75 – 5.81

Characteristics
- Evolutionary stage: main sequence
- Spectral type: B9pSi
- U−B color index: −0.42
- B−V color index: −0.12
- Variable type: SX Ari

Astrometry
Radial velocity (R_{v})	+18.0 km/s
Proper motion (μ)	RA: +11.899(94) mas/yr Dec.: −18.294(88) mas/yr
Parallax (π)	7.8671±0.0651 mas
Distance	415 ± 3 ly (127 ± 1 pc)
Absolute magnitude (M_{V})	+0.25

Details
Mass	3.2±0.3 M_{☉}
Radius	2.38±0.20 R_{☉}
Luminosity	138+24 −20 L_{☉}
Surface gravity (log g)	3.97 cgs
Temperature	12,800±300 K
Metallicity [Fe/H]	+0.45 dex
Rotation	0.7278972 days
Rotational velocity (v sin i)	165±5 km/s
Age	174 Myr

Other designations
- 56 Ari, SX Ari, BD+26°523, HD 19832, HIP 14893, HR 954, SAO 75788

Database references
SIMBAD	data

56 Arietis is a single, variable star in the northern zodiac constellation of Aries. It has the variable star designation SX Arietis, while 56 Arietis is the Flamsteed designation. This object is visible to the naked eye as a faint, blue-white hued point of light with an apparent visual magnitude of about 5.8. The estimated distance to this star is approximately 415 light-years (127 parsecs), based on parallax, and it is drifting further away with a radial velocity of +18 km/s.

This is a magnetic, chemically peculiar star of the silicon type with a stellar classification of B9pSi, and it has a rapid rotation period of 17.5 hours. This period is increasing by about two seconds every hundred years. The star displays evidence of a five year period for procession of its axis. Sanford S. Provin discovered that 56 Arietis is a variable star in 1952, and reported the discovery in 1953. It is the prototype of a class of variable stars known as SX Arietis variables, which are rotationally variable stars with strong magnetic fields. It ranges in brightness from 5.75 down to 5.81 with a cyclical period matching its rotation rate.
