= SX Arietis variable =

Type of variable star

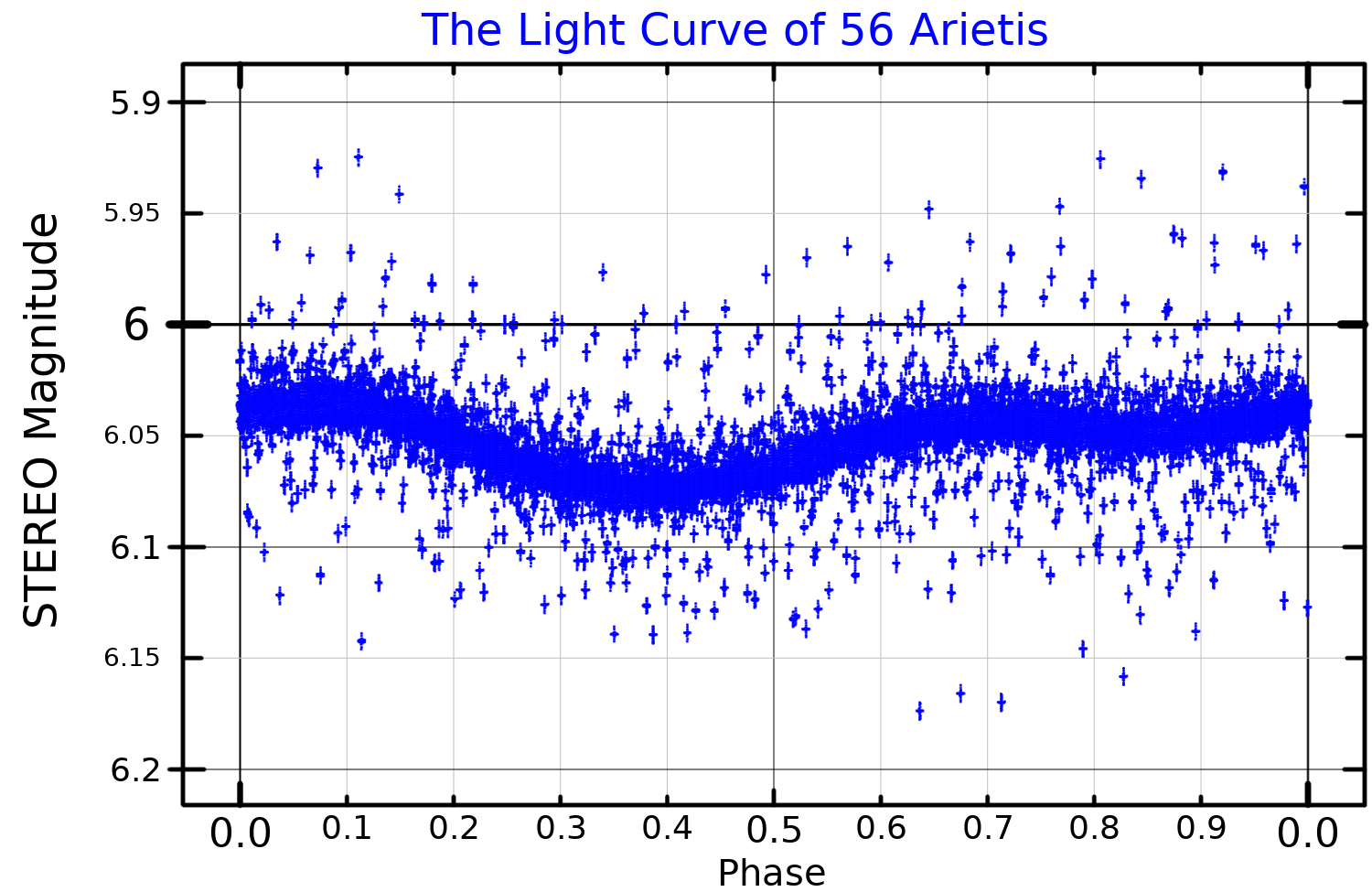
A light curve for SX Arietis (56 Arietis) from STEREO spacecraft data. Adapted from Wraight et al. (2012)

SX Arietis variables are a class of variable stars. They are generally B-type main sequence stars of spectral types B0p to B9p— high-temperature analogues of Alpha^{2}Canum Venaticorum variables—and exhibit strong magnetic fields and intense He I and Si III spectral lines. They have brightness fluctuations of approximately 0.1 magnitudes with periods of about one day. The prototype of this class is 56 Arietis, which bears the variable star designation SX Arietis.

== List ==
The following list contains selected SX Arietis variable that are of interest to amateur or professional astronomy. Unless otherwise noted, the given magnitudes are in the V-band.

Star	Average magnitude	Spectral type	Period (in days)	Distance (in parsecs)
Alpha Sculptoris	4.27	B7IIIp		238
Sigma Lupi	4.42	B2III	3.02	176
HD 125823	4.42	B7IIIpv	8.82	140
HR 2949	4.43	B5IV	1.90	113
28 Cygni	4.93	B2.5Ve	0.70	317
36 Lyncis	5.29	B9	3.83	178
HD 142990	5.43	B5V	0.98	170
V692 Coronae Australis	5.46	B2.5III	1.67	357
HD 21699	5.46	B8IIImnp	2.48	186
56 Arietis	5.76	B6IV-V	0.73	154
HD 133880	5.79	B8IVSi	0.88	111
HD 28843	5.81	B9III	1.37	146
3 Scorpii	5.87	B8III/IV	1.46	158
V957 Scorpii	5.90	B6V		258
V929 Scorpii	5.92	B8V	1.49	161
HR 7355	6.02	B2Vn	0.52	273
HD 145792	6.42	B6IV	1.70	144
HD 37017	6.56	B1.5V	(Note: also an eclipsing binary)	380
Sigma Orionis E	6.61	B2Vp	1.19	329
HD 37776	6.96	B2V	1.54	330
HD 37058	7.30	B3Vp	15.26	
HD 184927	7.44	B2V	9.35	543
HD 191612	7.80	O8fpe	538	2041
HD 35298	7.91	B7IV	1.85	532
HD 36668	8.05	B8V	2.12	249
HD 34626	8.16	B1.5IVnp	0.50	483
