= HD 125823 =

Star in the constellation Centaurus

- Location of a Centauri (circled in red)

Observation data Epoch J2000.0 Equinox ICRS
- Constellation: Centaurus
- Right ascension: 14^{h} 23^{m} 02.24^{s}
- Declination: −39° 30′ 42.5″
- Apparent magnitude (V): +4.41

Characteristics
- Evolutionary stage: main sequence
- Spectral type: B2V
- U−B color index: −0.75
- B−V color index: −0.19
- Variable type: SX Ari

Astrometry
Radial velocity (R_{v})	+7.13±0.16 km/s
Proper motion (μ)	RA: −24.15±0.13 mas/yr Dec.: −21.90±0.13 mas/yr
Parallax (π)	7.13±0.16 mas
Distance	460 ± 10 ly (140 ± 3 pc)
Absolute magnitude (M_{V})	−1.27

Details
Mass	5.4501±0.0067 M_{☉}
Radius	3.0071±0.0054 R_{☉}
Luminosity	1,019±9 L_{☉}
Surface gravity (log g)	4.20±0.12 cgs
Temperature	18,863+57 −56 K
Rotation	8.817744 days
Rotational velocity (v sin i)	16.0 km/s
Age	23.61±0.13 Myr

Other designations
- Bidelman's Helium Variable Star, a Centauri, V761 Centauri, CD−38 9329, HD 125823, HIP 70300, HR 5378, SAO 205497

Database references
SIMBAD	data

HD 125823, also known as V761 Centauri or a Centauri, is a variable star in the constellation Centaurus. It is a blue-white star that is visible to the naked eye with a mean apparent visual magnitude of +4.41. The distance to this star is approximately 460 light years based on parallax measurements. It is a member of the Upper Centaurus–Lupus subgroup of the Scorpius–Centaurus association.

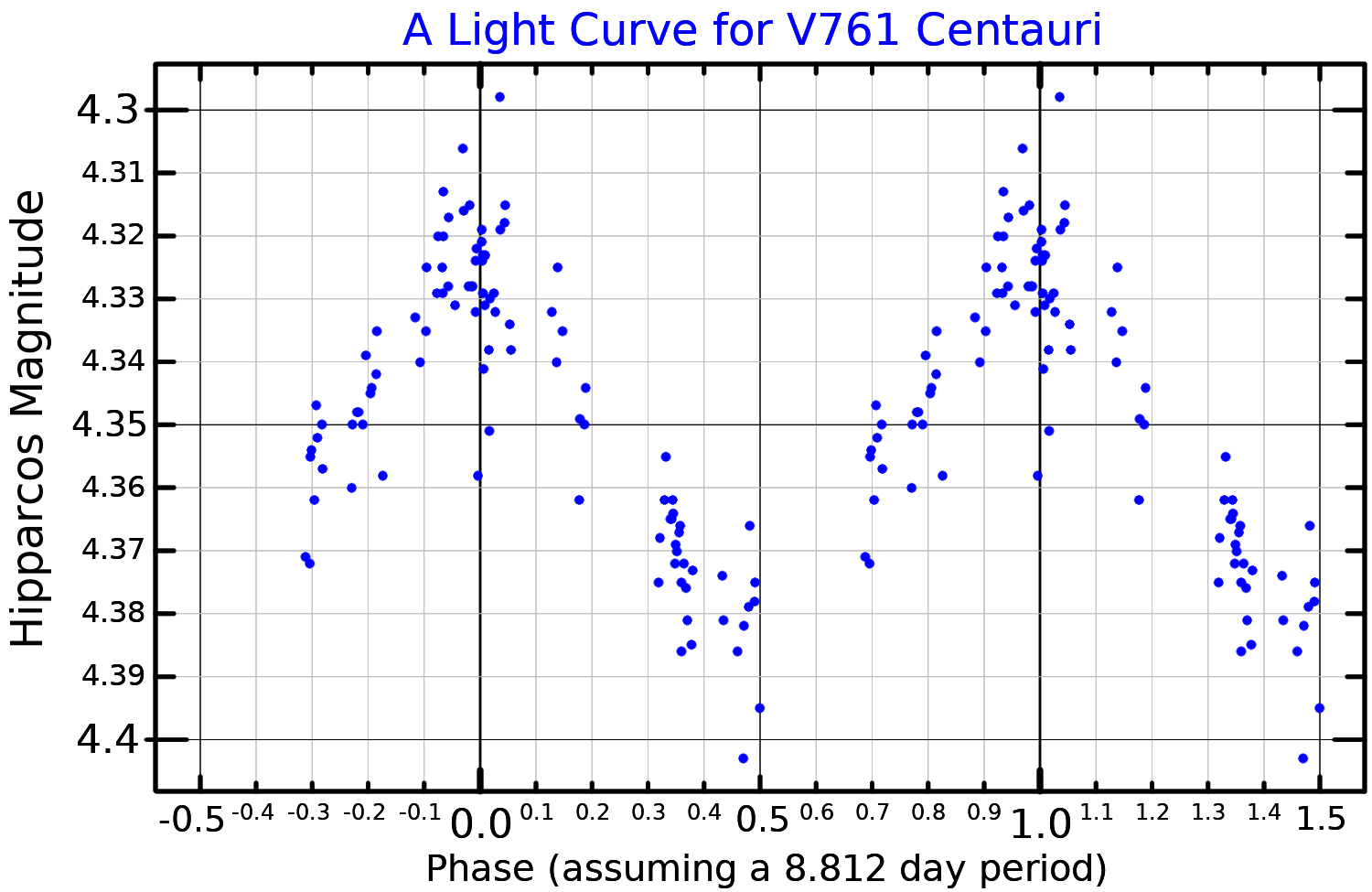
A light curve V761 Centauri, plotted from Hipparcos data

In 1965, W. P. Bidelman discovered that the intensities of the star's neutral helium lines had varied on photographic plates taken over the period 1908 to 1911. This variation was confirmed by A. D. Thackeray in 1966. The star ranges from a helium-strong B2 class to a helium-weak B8 with a period of 8.82 days. Radial velocity measurements during the 1970s showed differing velocity variations for helium and other elements. The magnetic field strength peaks at a negative maximum in phase with the maximum helium line strength. Weak emission has been detected in the singly-ionized lines of silicon, magnesium, and iron, but not in the neutral lines of hydrogen and helium.

This is a magnetic peculiar Bp star that shows periodic variation in the strength of its neutral helium lines. It is classified as an SX Arietis type variable star and its brightness varies from magnitude +4.38 to +4.43 with a period of 8.82 days. The star displays very different helium abundances between the two hemispheres, and, unusually, helium-3 has been detected in the weaker southern hemisphere. Latitudinal abundance concentrations have been found for iron, nitrogen, and oxygen. The variation in helium concentration effects the density scale height of the atmosphere, causing helium rich regions to have a lower luminosity in the visual band but emitting stronger levels of far ultraviolet.
