= HD 37017 =

Binary star system in the constellation Orion

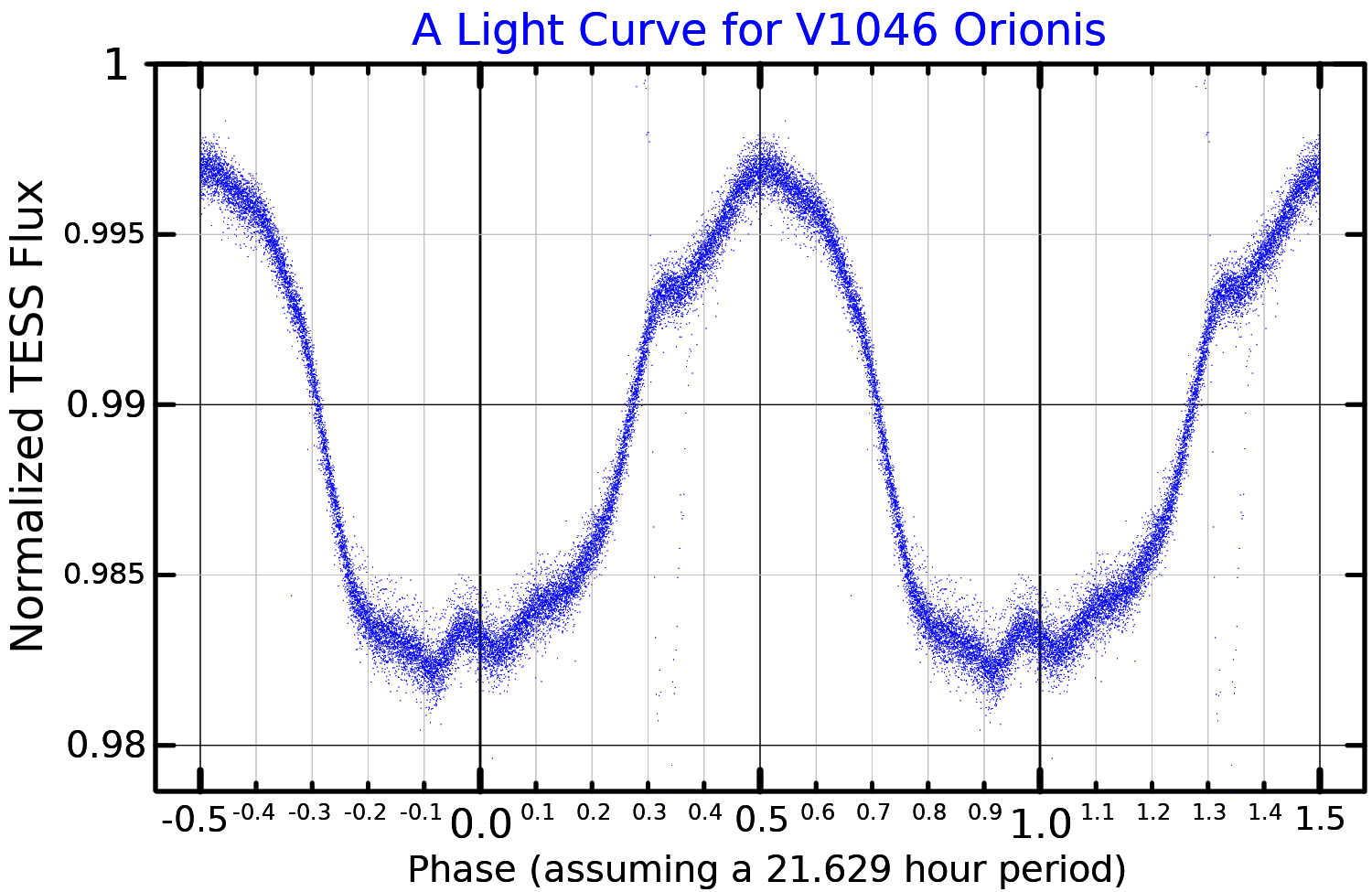
- A light curve for V1046 Orionis, plotted from TESS data

Observation data Epoch J2000 Equinox ICRS
- Constellation: Orion
- Right ascension: 05^{h} 35^{m} 21.86770^{s}
- Declination: −04° 29′ 39.0409″
- Apparent magnitude (V): 6.555 – 6.571

Characteristics
- Evolutionary stage: B2/3V (B1.5 Vp He strong)
- U−B color index: −0.79
- B−V color index: −0.14
- Variable type: SX Ari

Astrometry
Radial velocity (R_{v})	+32±2 km/s
Proper motion (μ)	RA: 1.88±0.09 mas/yr Dec.: 1.20±0.14 mas/yr
Parallax (π)	2.643±0.075 mas
Distance	1,230 ± 40 ly (380 ± 10 pc)
Absolute magnitude (M_{V})	−1.2

Orbit
Period (P)	18.6556±0.0017 d
Semi-major axis (a)	≥12.61±1.09 R_{☉}
Eccentricity (e)	0.31±0.05
Periastron epoch (T)	2,435,461.602±0.168 JD
Argument of periastron (ω) (secondary)	133±5°
Semi-amplitude (K_{1}) (primary)	36.0±2.5 km/s

Details

A
Mass	8.50±0.53 M_{☉}
Luminosity	3,754 L_{☉}
Temperature	23,700 K
Rotation	0.901 d
Rotational velocity (v sin i)	165 km/s

B
Mass	4.5 M_{☉}

Other designations
- V1046 Orionis, BD−04°1183, HD 37017, HIP 26233, HR 1890, SAO 132317

Database references
SIMBAD	data

HD 37017 is a binary star system in the equatorial constellation of Orion. It has the variable star designation V1046 Orionis; HD 37017 is the identifier from the Henry Draper Catalogue. The system is a challenge to view with the naked eye, being close to the lower limit of visibility with a combined apparent visual magnitude of 6.6. It is located at a distance of approximately 1,230 light years based on parallax, and is drifting further away with a radial velocity of +32 km/s. The system is part of star cluster NGC 1981.

The binary nature of this system was suggested by A. Blaauw and T. S. van Albada in 1963. It is a double-lined spectroscopic binary with an orbital period of 18.6556 days and an eccentricity of 0.31. The eccentricity is considered unusually large for such a close system. It has been suspected of being an eclipsing binary or rotating ellipsoidal variable, and the primary is also am SX Arietis variable.

The primary is a helium-strong, magnetic chemically peculiar star with a stellar classification of B1.5 Vp. It has a magnetic field strength of 7,700 G, and the helium concentrations are located at the magnetic poles. V1046 Orionis was found to be a variable star by L. A. Balona in 1997, and is now classified as an SX Arietis variable. The star undergoes periodic changes in visual brightness, magnetic field strength, and spectral characteristics with a cycle time of 0.901175 days – the star's presumed rotation period. Radio emission has been detected that varies with the rotation period.

The secondary component has an estimated 4.5 times the mass of the Sun. The class has been estimated as type B6III-IV.
