= V692 Coronae Australis =

SX Areits variable; Corona Australis

- Location of V692 CrA (circled)

Observation data Epoch J2000.0 Equinox ICRS
- Constellation: Corona Australis
- Right ascension: 18^{h} 13^{m} 12.69843^{s}
- Declination: −41° 20′ 09.9972″
- Apparent magnitude (V): 5.46 - 5.51

Characteristics
- Spectral type: B2 III or B1.5 IIIp
- B−V color index: −0.17
- Variable type: SX Arietis

Astrometry
Radial velocity (R_{v})	−15.3±2.8 km/s
Proper motion (μ)	RA: −2.050 mas/yr Dec.: −6.210 mas/yr
Parallax (π)	1.7423±0.0977 mas
Distance	1,900 ± 100 ly (570 ± 30 pc)
Absolute magnitude (M_{V})	−6.44 or −2.26

Details
Mass	7.35±0.48 M_{☉}
Radius	12.6±0.7 R_{☉}
Luminosity (bolometric)	4,181 L_{☉}
Surface gravity (log g)	3.52^{+0.33}_{−0.14} cgs
Temperature	17,061^{+1,474}_{−1,357} K
Rotational velocity (v sin i)	212±9 km/s
Age	31.6±5.1 Myr

Other designations
- 3 G. Corona Australis, V692 CrA, CD−41°12534, CPD−41°8620, GC 24824, HD 166596, HIP 89290, HR 6804, SAO 228815

Database references
SIMBAD	data

V692 Coronae Australis (HD 166596; HR 6804; 3 G. CrA), or simply V692 CrA, is a whitish-blue hued variable star located in the southern constellation Corona Australis. It has a maximum apparent magnitude of around 5.5, making it faintly visible to the naked eye. The object is located relatively far at a distance of approximately 1,900 light years based on Gaia DR3 parallax measurements, but it is approaching the Solar System with a fairly constrained heliocentric radial velocity of −15.3 km/s. At its current distance, V692 CrA's brightness is heavily diminished by 0.46 magnitudes due to extinction due to interstellar dust. Its absolute magnitude depends on the source: Westin (1985) gave a value of −6.44 while the extended Hipparcos catalogue gave a value of −2.26.

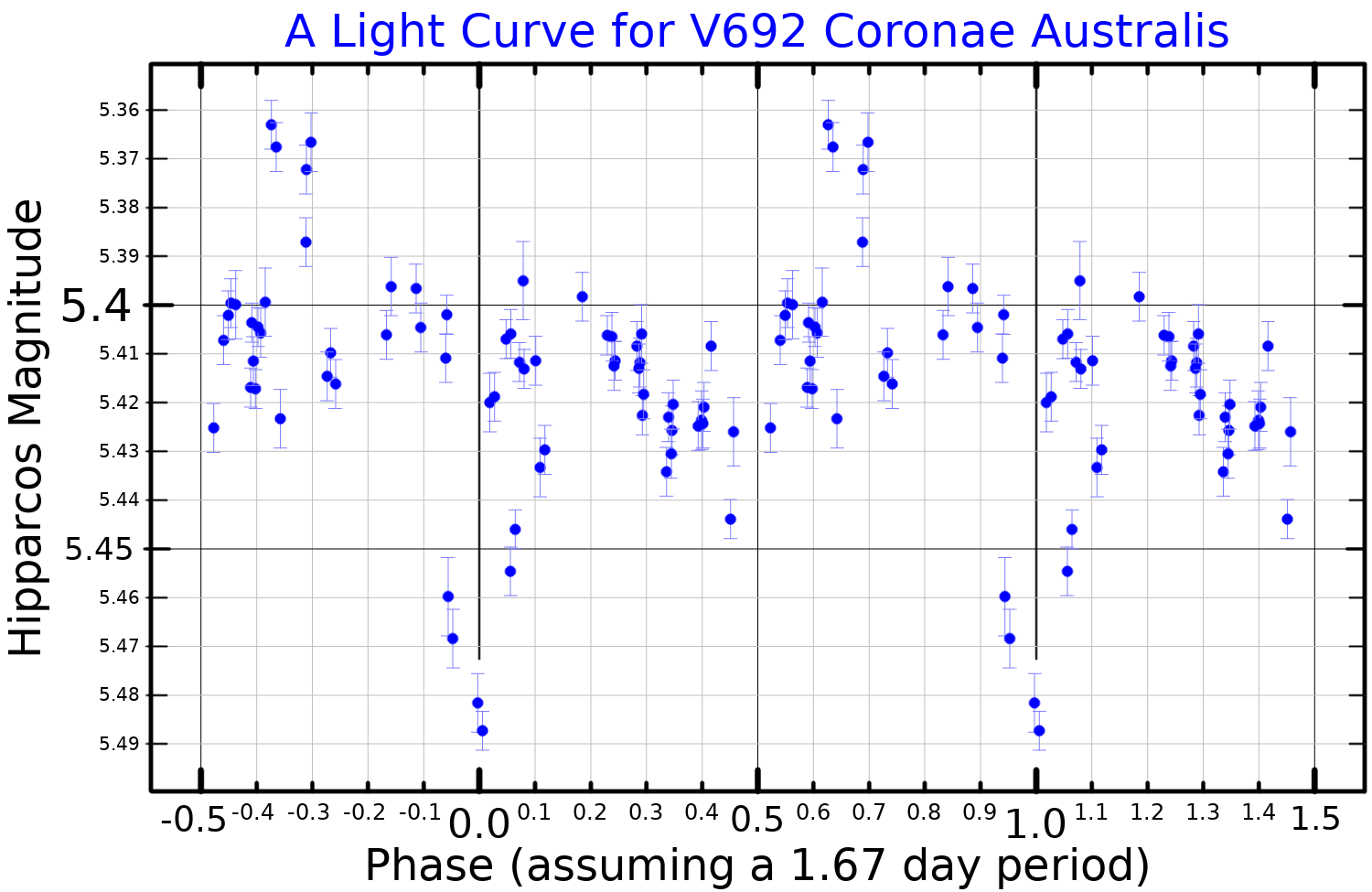
A light curve for V692 Coronae Australis, plotted from Hipparcos data

Astronomers Carlos and Mercedes Jaschek along with a colleague listed HD 166596 as a Be star in 1964. However, its status as an Ap star was not observed until 1979 by astronomers N. Vogt and A.M Faundez. A year later, HD 166596 was observed to be variable and it had a period of 1.67 days. In 1981, its variability was confirmed and it was given the variable star designation V692 Coronae Australis—the 692nd variable star in Corona Australis. The star might have a longer period of 2.075 days.

V692 CrA has a stellar classification of B2 III or B1.5 IIIp, both indicating that it is a slightly evolved B-type giant star. The second classification indicates that V692 CrA has peculiarities in its spectrum. It has 7.35 times the mass of the Sun and 12.6 times the Sun's radius. It radiates at a bolometric luminosity 4,181 times that of the Sun from its photosphere at an effective temperature of 17,061 K. V692 CrA is estimated to be 31.6 million years old and it spins rapidly with a projected rotational velocity of 212 km/s.
