= HD 34626 =

Star in the constellation Auriga

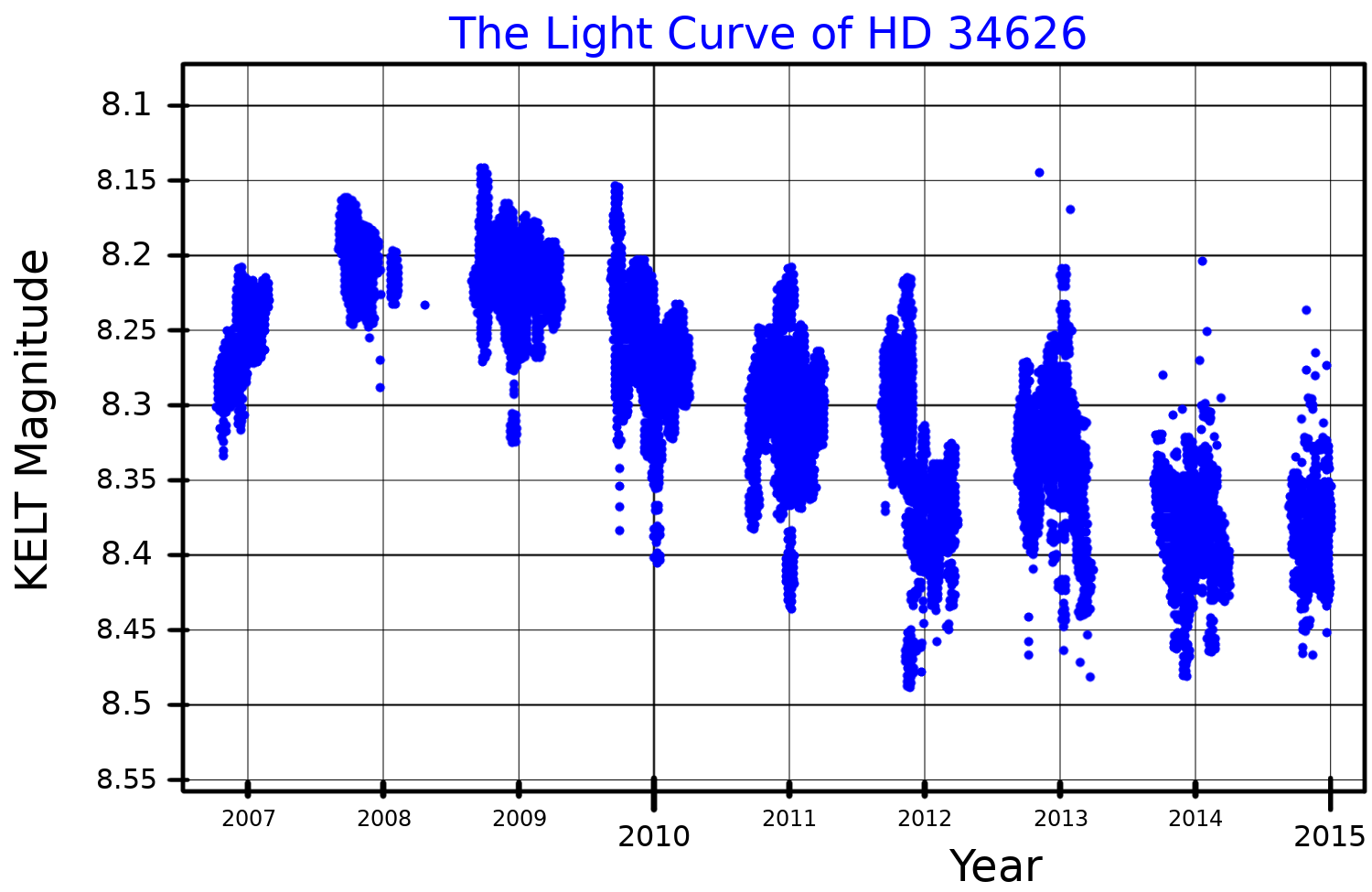
- A light curve for HD 34626 from KELT data, adapted from Labadie-Bartz et al. (2017)

Observation data Epoch J2000 Equinox J2000
- Constellation: Auriga
- Right ascension: 05^{h} 20^{m} 33.03590^{s}
- Declination: +36° 37′ 56.0306″
- Apparent magnitude (V): 8.16

Characteristics
- Evolutionary stage: subgiant
- Spectral type: B1.5 IVnp
- U−B color index: −0.68
- B−V color index: +0.03
- Variable type: SX Ari?

Astrometry
Radial velocity (R_{v})	−6 km/s
Proper motion (μ)	RA: −0.630 mas/yr Dec.: −4.017 mas/yr
Parallax (π)	0.9831±0.0356 mas
Distance	3,300 ± 100 ly (1,020 ± 40 pc)

Details
Mass	4.4 M_{☉}
Radius	21 R_{☉}
Luminosity	556 L_{☉}
Temperature	22,675 K
Rotational velocity (v sin i)	310 km/s
Age	200 Myr

Other designations
- MZ Aurigae, MZ Aur, BD+36°1090, HD 34626, HIP 24938, SAO 57915.

Database references
SIMBAD	data

HD 34626, also known as MZ Aurigae, is an unusual variable star in the northern constellation of Auriga. It has an apparent magnitude of 8.2 and is about 3,300 light years away.

The spectrum of HD 34626 had long been known to be unusual, with very broad lines indicating rapid rotation and emission lines marking it as a Be star. In 1970, John R. Percy found that it varies in brightness by 0.1 magnitude over time scales of 8 to 12 hours, but these variations are not periodic. This indicates the variability is not caused by ellipsoidal effects, and the nature of the variability remains unknown. It may be a type of SX Arietis variable. It was given its variable star designation in 1972.

HD 34626 has exhausted its core hydrogen and evolved away from the main sequence. Its spectral type indicates that it is a subgiant, but evolutionary models suggest it may be in the giant stage.
