= V2052 Ophiuchi =

Variable star in the constellation Ophiuchus

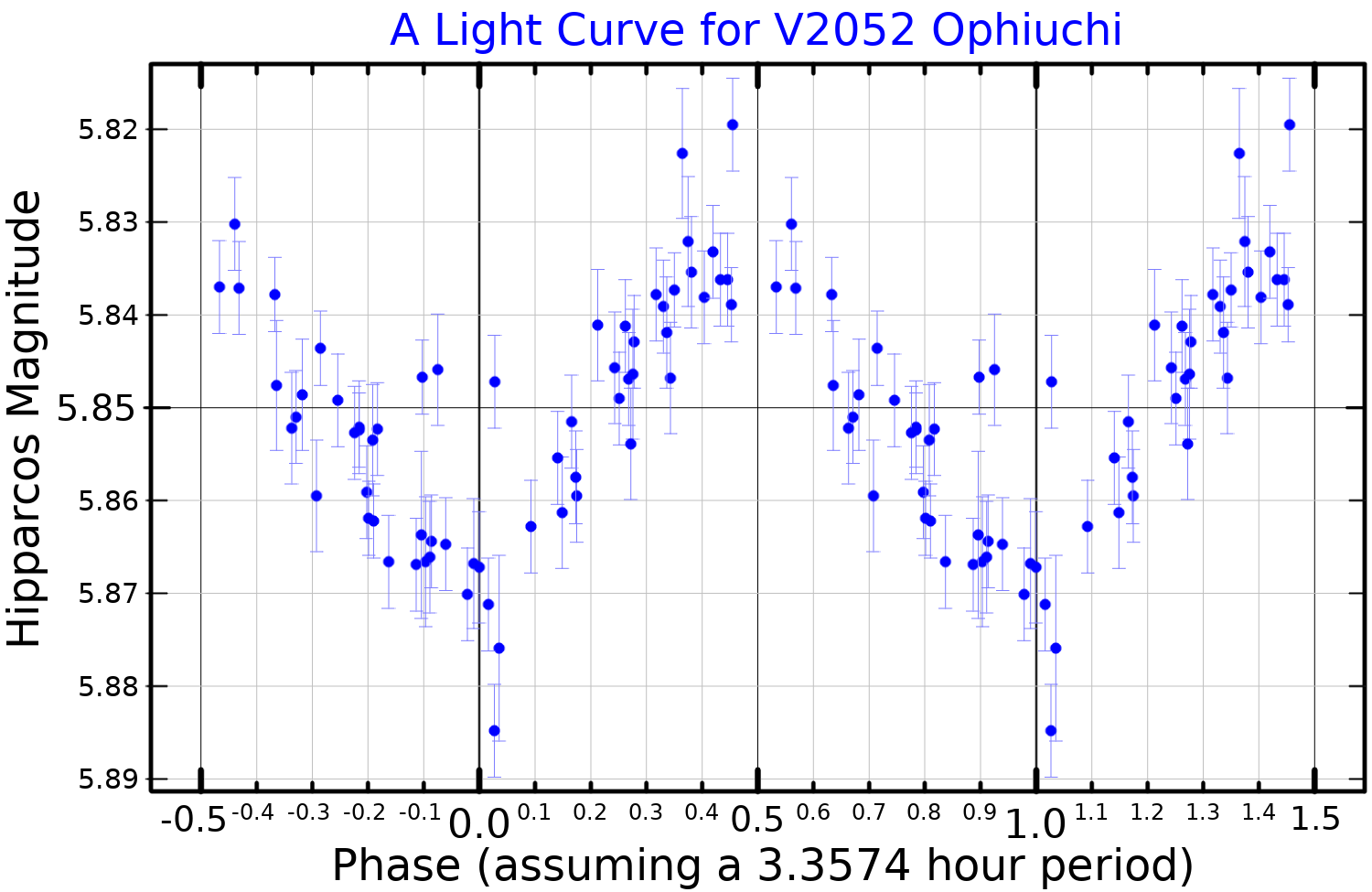
- A light curve for V2052 Ophiuchi, plotted from Hipparcos data

Observation data Epoch J2000.0 Equinox J2000.0
- Constellation: Ophiuchus
- Right ascension: 17^{h} 56^{m} 18.40012^{s}
- Declination: +00° 40′ 13.2733″
- Apparent magnitude (V): 5.81 – 5.84

Characteristics
- Evolutionary stage: main sequence
- Spectral type: B2 IV–V
- U−B color index: −0.66
- B−V color index: +0.09
- Variable type: β Cephei

Astrometry
| Proper motion (μ) | RA: −4.997±0.038 mas/yr Dec.: −0.369±0.038 mas/yr |
| Parallax (π) | 3.5446±0.0453 mas |
| Distance | 920 ± 10 ly (282 ± 4 pc) |
| Absolute magnitude (M_{V}) | −2.54 |

Details
| Mass | 8.9±0.7 M_{☉} |
| Radius | 4.1±0.2 R_{☉} |
| Luminosity | 3,426 L_{☉} |
| Surface gravity (log g) | 4.00 cgs |
| Temperature | 23,000±1,000 K |
| Metallicity [Fe/H] | +0.012 dex |
| Rotation | 3.638833±0.000003 d |
| Rotational velocity (v sin i) | 60 km/s |
| Age | 21 Myr |

Other designations
- HD 163472, HIP 87812, HR 6684, SAO 122935

Database references
| SIMBAD | data |

V2052 Ophiuchi, also known as HR 6684, is a star about 920 light years from Earth in the constellation Ophiuchus. It is a 5th-magnitude star, making it faintly visible to the naked eye of an observer far from city lights. V2052 Ophiuchi is a Beta Cephei variable (β Cep) star, varying slightly in brightness from magnitude 5.81 to 5.84 over a period of about 3.4 hours.

In 1972, Mikolaj Jerzykiewicz announced that HR 6684 is a variable star, based on his observations using the 0.6 meter Air Force Telescope on Mauna Kea. He classified the star as a β Cep variable with period of 0.13989 days, He further noted that if confirmed, it would be the least luminous and shortest period β Cep star known up to that date. Spectroscopic and photometric observations by D. Harold McNamara and Bruce Bills in 1973 confirmed Jerzykiewicz's results. In 1973, HR 6684 was given the variable star designation V2052 Ophiuchi.

In 1994, Henryk Cugier et al. determined that V2052 Ophiuchi pulsated primarily in the fundamental (l=0) radial mode. A much less powerful non-radial pulsation mode was identified in 2003. Ultraviolet observations by the TD-1A satellite show that throughout its pulsation cycle, the temperature of V2052 Ophiuchi varies by 1040±880 K, and its radius changes by 3.1%±0.9%. Observations at the Pic du Midi Observatory showed that V2052 Ophiuchi has a dipole magnetic field, the axis of which is offset from the star's center, and there are helium spots on the surface near the magnetic poles. V2052 Ophiuchi is a type of chemically peculiar star known as a helium-strong star. Its surface is over-abundant in helium, and under-abundant in oxygen, perhaps due to its magnetic field differentially effecting the diffusion of elements in its atmosphere.
