= Theta Hydri =

Star in the constellation Hydrus

Observation data Epoch J2000.0 Equinox J2000.0 (ICRS)
- Constellation: Hydrus
- Right ascension: 03^{h} 02^{m} 15.449^{s}
- Declination: −71° 54′ 08.84″
- Apparent magnitude (V): 5.53

Characteristics
- Evolutionary stage: main sequence
- Spectral type: B8 III/IV
- U−B color index: −0.51
- B−V color index: −0.14

Astrometry
Radial velocity (R_{v})	+12.3±1.6 km/s
Proper motion (μ)	RA: +27.256 mas/yr Dec.: +16.598 mas/yr
Parallax (π)	6.4996±0.0619 mas
Distance	502 ± 5 ly (154 ± 1 pc)
Absolute magnitude (M_{V})	−0.48

Details
Luminosity	287 L_{☉}
Surface gravity (log g)	3.76 cgs
Temperature	13,350 K
Rotation	4.3720 d
Age	211 Myr

Other designations
- θ Hyi, CPD−72°219, FK5 113, HD 19400, HIP 14131, HR 939, SAO 255945, WDS J03023-7154AB

Database references
SIMBAD	data

Theta Hydri, Latinized from θ Hydri, is a blue-white hued star in the southern constellation of Hydrus. It is faintly visible to the naked eye with an apparent visual magnitude of +5.53. Based upon an annual parallax shift of 6.50 mas as seen from Earth, it is located approximately 502 light years. At that distance, the visual magnitude of the star is diminished by an extinction of 0.10 due to interstellar dust. It is moving away from the Sun with a radial velocity of +12.3 km/s.

A stellar classification of B8 III/IV suggests it is an evolving B-type star showing mixed traits of a subgiant or giant star. It is a PGa star – a sub-class of the higher temperature chemically peculiar stars known as mercury-manganese stars (HgMn stars). That is, it displays a rich spectra of singly-ionized phosphorus and gallium, in addition to ionized mercury and manganese. As such, Theta Hydri forms a typical example of this type. The absorption lines for these ionized elements are found to vary, most likely as the result of uneven surface distribution combined with the star's rotation. It is a helium-weak star, having helium lines that are anomalously weak for its spectral type. A weak and variable longitudinal magnetic field has been detected.

There is a nearby companion star of class A0 IV located at an angular separation of 0.1 arc seconds along a position angle of 179°, as of 2002. Schöller et al. (2010) consider this to be a visual companion, although Eggleton and Tokovinin (2008) listed the pair as a probable binary star system.
