= HD 144941 =

Star in the constellation Scorpius

Observation data Epoch J2000 Equinox J2000
- Constellation: Scorpius
- Right ascension: 16^{h} 09^{m} 24.551^{s}
- Declination: −27° 13′ 38.18″
- Apparent magnitude (V): 10.141±0.008

Characteristics
- Evolutionary stage: Main sequence
- Spectral type: B8
- B−V color index: 0.034±0.007

Astrometry
Radial velocity (R_{v})	−43.7±0.5 km/s
Proper motion (μ)	RA: −6.834 mas/yr Dec.: 8.023 mas/yr
Parallax (π)	0.6714±0.0282 mas
Distance	4,900 ± 200 ly (1,490 ± 60 pc)
Absolute magnitude (M_{V})	−1.85+0.10 −0.11

Details
Mass	8.1±0.3 M_{☉}
Radius	3.8±0.2 R_{☉}
Luminosity	2,950+290 −260 L_{☉}
Surface gravity (log g)	4.2±0.1 cgs
Temperature	22,000±500 K
Metallicity [Fe/H]	−2.0 dex
Rotation	13.9±0.2 d
Rotational velocity (v sin i)	7±5 km/s
Age	11.0+6.4 −7.8 Myr

Other designations
- AAVSO 1603-26, CD−26°11229, HD 144941, SAO 108933, PPM 265193

Database references
SIMBAD	data

HD 144941 is a massive helium-strong star in the southern constellation of Scorpius. With an apparent visual magnitude of 10.1, it requires a telescope to view. Based on parallax measurements, it is located at a distance of approximately 4,900 light years from the Sun. The star is drifting closer with a radial velocity of −44 km/s.

== Observations ==
In 1960, a study of stellar spectra of the southern sky taken at Cerro Tololo showed this to be a helium rich, hydrogen deficient star. Spectra taken from La Silla Observatory in 1973 showed an under abundance of nitrogen and carbon by a factor of ten compared to normal B-type stars. Helium shows a number abundance ten times that of hydrogen. The metallicity of the star is very low, which may explain why it displays no radial pulsations like those found in similar helium stars.

Most extreme helium stars can be explained based on an evolutionary stage past the asymptotic giant branch. However, HD 144941 has too high a surface gravity for that scenario, and its surface elemental abundances are atypical. An alternative scenario is the merger of two helium dwarfs. The most likely scenario has the merger begun with about half the mass of a star being transferred to the binary companion in a period of a few minutes. The second half happens more gradually, with the contributing star depositing mass into an accretion ring. The combined star resembled a red giant before becoming an extreme helium star. The resulting composition suggests both progenitor stars were of low metallicity.

In 2018, photometry showed low amplitude changes in brightness that are most likely caused by surface variations resembling spots. The variations were compatible with a rotation period of 13.9±0.2 d. A strong magnetic field was detected in 2021, explaining the spots. This is thought to either be a fossil field left over from prior stages in the stellar evolution, or a product of the merger process. The average surface magnetic field strength is 11.226 kG, and the dipole field has an unusually high angle of 65° to the rotation. No extreme helium stars have been found that possess a magnetic field with rotational modulation of their brightness.

A 2021 study of HD 144941 indicated that it is much different than previously believed, being a massive, magnetic, helium–strong star. The strong magnetic field is essential for producing the He–strong appearance in main sequence B-type stars. A stellar wind in the presence of this field accelerates the hydrogen away from the surface while causing helium to fall back onto the star, steadily enriching the surface helium. The high helium to hydrogen ratio makes HD 144941 the most extreme example of a He-strong star known.

Modelled as a helium-strong star, HD 144941 is about 11 million years old and roughly 30% of the way through its main sequence lifetime. It has about 8 time the mass of the Sun and four times the Sun's radius. The star is radiating nearly 3,000 times the luminosity of the Sun from its photosphere at an effective temperature of 22,000 K. The motion of HD 144941 through the galaxy suggests that it is a runaway star. It would have been ejected from the Sagittarius arm about 6.2 million years ago. The star is expected to continue to increase its galactic latitude to about 3.6 thousand light-years (1.1 kpc) over the galactic plane, then explode as a supernova. The resulting remnant may be a magnetar.
