= NGC 1981 =

Open cluster in the constellation Orion

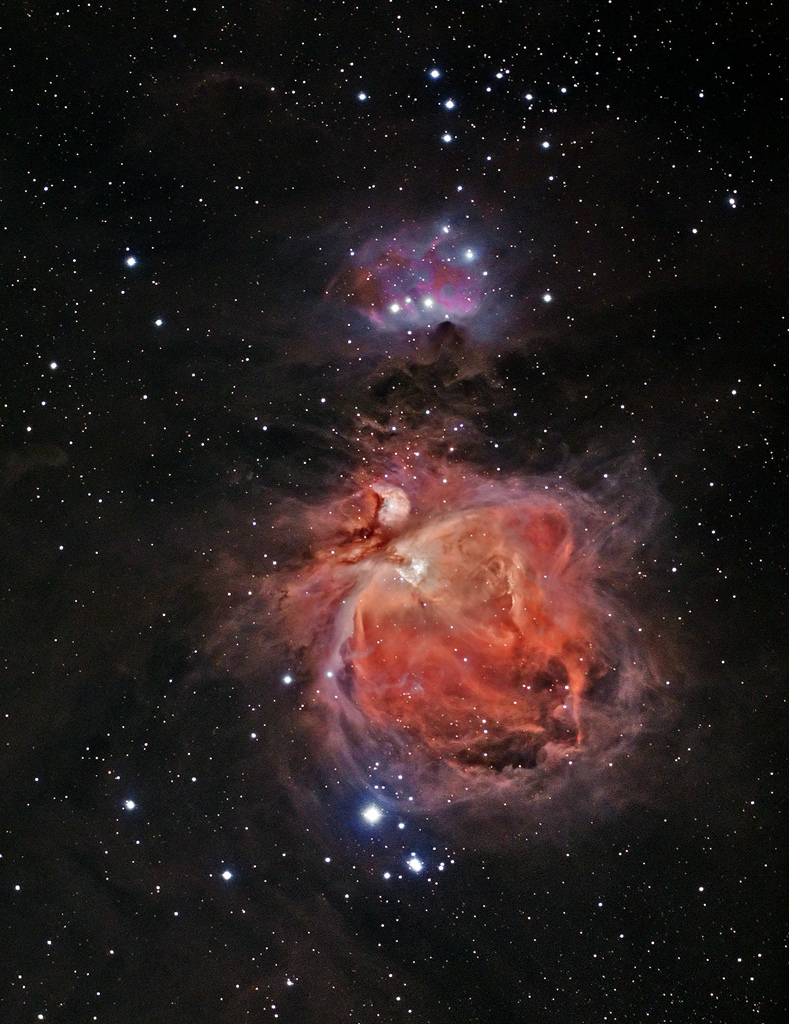
- NGC 1981 is the sparse scattering of bright stars without nebulosity at the top (north) of this image of the Orion Nebula region Credit: David St. Louis

Observation data (J2000.0 epoch)
- Right ascension: 05^{h} 35^{m} 09.6^{s}
- Declination: −04° 25′ 30″
- Distance: 1,300 (400)
- Apparent magnitude (V): 4.2
- Apparent dimensions (V): 28.00

Physical characteristics
- Other designations: OCL 525, Collinder 73

Associations
- Constellation: Orion

NGC 1981 (also known as OCL 525 or the Coal Car Cluster) is an open cluster which is located in the constellation Orion. It was discovered by John Herschel on 4 January 1827. Its apparent magnitude is 4.2 and its size is 28.00 arc minutes. It lies to the north of the Orion Nebula, separated from it by the Sh2-279 region containing NGC 1973, 1975, and 1977.

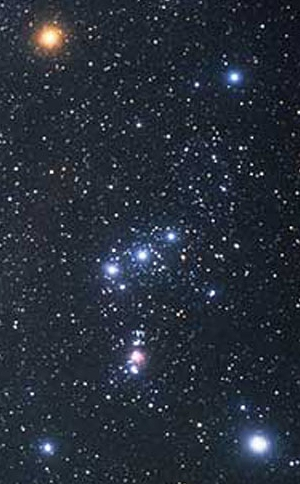
NGC 1981 is a sparse, young open star cluster located in the constellation Orion. [1, 2]
