= HR 7355 =

Star in the constellation of Sagittarius

Observation data Epoch J2000.0 Equinox J2000.0
- Constellation: Sagittarius
- Right ascension: 19^{h} 24^{m} 30.180^{s}
- Declination: −27° 51′ 57.40″
- Apparent magnitude (V): 6.03

Characteristics
- Evolutionary stage: main sequence
- Spectral type: B2Vnn
- U−B color index: −0.693
- B−V color index: −0.117±0.008

Astrometry
Radial velocity (R_{v})	3.80±2.40 km/s
Proper motion (μ)	RA: 11.082 mas/yr Dec.: −14.747 mas/yr
Parallax (π)	4.2889±0.1013 mas
Distance	760 ± 20 ly (233 ± 6 pc)
Absolute magnitude (M_{V})	−1.12

Details
Mass	6±0.5 M_{☉}
Radius	3.06±0.15 (polar) R_{☉}
Luminosity	972±272 L_{☉}
Surface gravity (log g)	4.25±0.47 (polar) cgs
Temperature	17,500±1,000 K
Rotation	0.5214404 d
Rotational velocity (v sin i)	310±5 km/s
Age	15 to 25 Myr

Other designations
- CD−28°15767, HD 182180, HIP 95408, HR 7355, SAO 188079

Database references
SIMBAD	data

HR 7355 is a star in the southern constellation of Sagittarius. It is faintly visible to the naked eye with an apparent visual magnitude of 6.03. The star is located at a distance of approximately 760 light years based on parallax measurements. The radial velocity of the star is poorly constrained, but it appears to be receding at the rate of +4 km/s.

The stellar classification of HR 7355 is B2Vnn, indicating this is a B-type main-sequence star. The 'nn' notation indicates "nebulous" lines caused by rapid rotation. It is spinning on its axis with a period of 0.52 days. The projected rotational velocity is 310 km/s, for an estimated equatorial rotation rate of 358 km/s. This is 89% of the star's critical velocity, giving the star an equatorial bulge that is 20% larger than the polar radius. The star is subject to significant gravity darkening, with an effective temperature at the pole of 19,751 K compared to 15,740 K at the equator.

In 2008 HR 7355 was found to be a He-strong star that is varying in both its brightness and hydrogen-α line. Previously, Helium-strong stars were thought to be slowly rotating, making this star a challenge to explain. The star shows no indications of pulsational behavior, with the variability instead being linked to its rapid spin; one of the fastest rates known for a star of its type. The light curve may be explained as characteristic of magnetic He-strong chemically peculiar stars, with the variations being caused by uneven distribution of helium on the surface.

This star has about six times the mass of the Sun and three times the Sun's radius at its poles. It possesses a strong, varying magnetic field with a surface longitudinal strength measured at several kilo-Gauss. The magnetosphere of the star is trapping gas in the circumstellar region, producing emission lines in the star's spectrum. The age of the star is estimated to be between 15 and 22 million years old, although it may be younger. It is radiating around 1,000 times the luminosity of the Sun from its photosphere.

== See also ==
- CU Virginis, another rapidly rotating Bp star
- σ Orionis E, another rapidly spinning helium-rich star
