= Helium-weak star =

Type of star

Helium-weak stars are chemically peculiar stars which have a weak helium lines for their spectral type. Their helium lines place them in a later (i.e. cooler) spectral type than their hydrogen lines.

== Helium-weak star ==
Helium-weak stars are mid-to-late B-class stars with weaker than normal spectral lines of neutral helium, compared to normal stars with similar hydrogen line strengths. These are considered to be an extension of the Ap/Bp chemically-peculiar stars with slightly hotter temperatures. They often show similar increased abundances of heavy elements. The mechanism of atmospheric stratification of elements is thought to be responsible for both types of chemical peculiarity.

This is a non-extensive list of helium-weak stars.

Helium-weak stars
| Star Name | Constellation | Apparent Magnitude (m_{v}) | Class | Notes |
|---|---|---|---|---|
| 20 Eridani (EG Eridani) | Eridanus | 5.23 | B8/9 III | α^{2} CVn variable |
| 30 Capricorni | Capricornus | 5.38 | B5 II/III | |
| θ Hydri | Hydrus | 5.50 | B8 III/IV | Suspected Binary; |
| 22 Eridani (FY Eridani) | Eridanus | 5.53 | B9 IIIpSi (4200) | α^{2} CVn variable |
| HD 74196 | Vela | 5.61 | B7 Vn | Part of IC 2391 |
| HD 28843 (DZ Eridani) | Eridanus | 5.81 | B9 III | SX Arietis variable |
| 12 Canis Majoris (HK Canis Majoris) | Canis Major | 6.08 | B7 II/III | SX Arietis variable |
| HD 34797 (TX Leporis) | Lepus | 6.54 | B7 Vp | α^{2} CVn variable; binary |
| HD 35456 | Orion | 6.95 | B9 II/III | Binary |

== Helium-strong star ==
A related class of stars have anomalously strong helium lines in their spectra, and are known as helium-strong stars. These are the more massive stars with classes of B1 to B3, compared to the helium-weak stars with classes of B5 to B9. The following are examples:

- HD 37017 A
- HD 144941
- HR 7355
- Sigma Lupi
- V2052 Ophiuchi

== Helium-variable star ==
V761 Centauri (a Centauri) is well-known for both the variability of its brightness and of its helium spectral lines. Stars of this type are referred to as helium-variable. This is thought to occur when one hemisphere of the star's atmosphere is helium-weak and one is helium-strong.

== See also ==
- Helium star
- Extreme helium star
