= CU Virginis =

Star in the constellation Virgo

- Location of CU Virginis (circled in red)

Observation data Epoch J2000 Equinox ICRS
- Constellation: Virgo
- Right ascension: 14^{h} 12^{m} 15.80554^{s}
- Declination: +02° 24′ 33.9452″
- Apparent magnitude (V): 4.92–5.07

Characteristics
- Evolutionary stage: main sequence
- Spectral type: ApSi or B8.5 Vp Si
- B−V color index: −0.118±0.006
- Variable type: α^{2} CVn

Astrometry
Radial velocity (R_{v})	−2.0±7.4 km/s
Proper motion (μ)	RA: −42.905 mas/yr Dec.: −26.792 mas/yr
Parallax (π)	13.2281±0.1291 mas
Distance	247 ± 2 ly (75.6 ± 0.7 pc)
Absolute magnitude (M_{V})	0.50

Details
Mass	3.06±0.06 M_{☉}
Radius	2.06±0.14 R_{☉}
Luminosity	100±11 L_{☉}
Surface gravity (log g)	4.30±0.06 cgs
Temperature	12,750±250 K
Rotation	0.5207137±0.0000010 d
Rotational velocity (v sin i)	145±3 km/s

Other designations
- CU Vir, BD+03°2867, FK5 3127, HD 124224, HIP 69389, HR 5313, SAO 120339, ADS 9152 A, WDS J14123+0225A

Database references
SIMBAD	data

CU Virginis is a single star in the equatorial constellation of Virgo. It has an apparent visual magnitude of about 5, which is bright enough to be faintly visible to the naked eye. The distance to this star can be estimated from its annual parallax shift of 13.2 mas, yielding 247 light years.

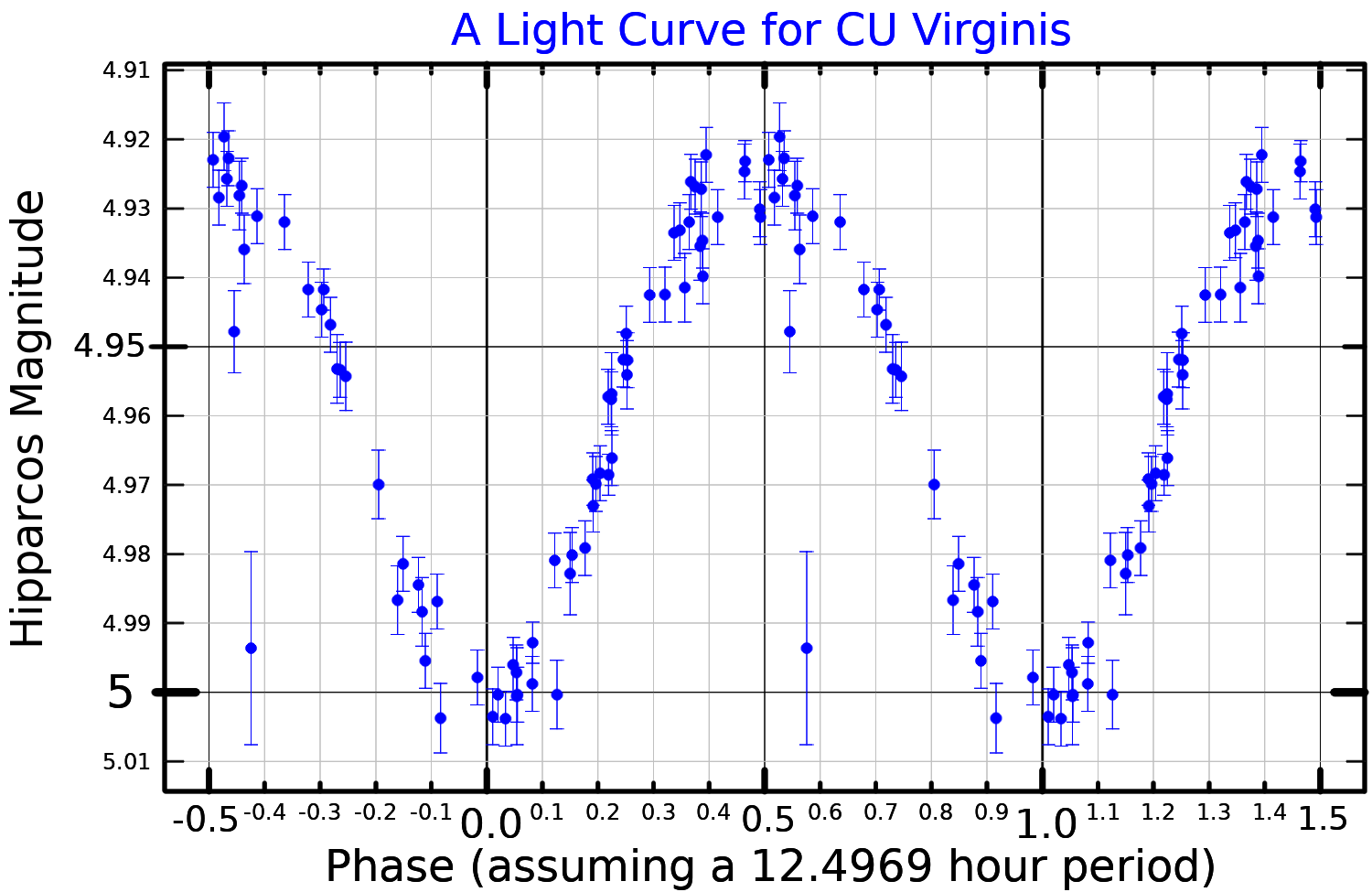
A light curve for CU Virginis, plotted from Hipparcos data

This is one of the best studied Ap stars. It has a stellar classification of Ap Si with strong lines of silicon and weak helium lines. The star is a fast rotator with a period of 0.52 days and an axis that is inclined by 46.5°±4.1° to the line of sight from the Earth. In 1956, Robert Hardie discovered that the star's brightness varies. Both the spectrum and luminosity of the star vary with the rotation, and it is classified as a α^{2} Canum Venaticorum variable with the designation CU Virginis (CU Vir). There is some evidence that the rotation period may vary slightly over a timescale measured in decades. Such changes have been observed to occur in glitches, rather than varying constantly.

CU Virginis has three times the mass of the Sun and double the Sun's radius. It is radiating 100 times the Sun's luminosity from its photosphere at an effective temperature of 12,750 K. The star has a strong magnetic field, placing it in the class of magnetic chemically peculiar stars. The polar magnetic field has a strength of about 3 kG. The magnetic pole may be displaced by 87° from the axis of rotation, and the effective magnetic field is seen to vary over the course of a rotation. The mean surface magnetic field varies over the range 1.2–3.2 kG.

This star is a radio emitter, with the emission being modulated by the rotational phase. This emission is believed to be gyrosynchrotron radiation emitted by mildly relativistic (Lorentz factor of γ ≤ 2) electrons trapped in the magnetosphere". Two pulses of 100% circularly polarized radio energy are detected each rotation, which may be produced via an electron cyclotron maser process. These polarized beams are then refracted as they pass through cold plasma in the star's magnetosphere.
