= MMC =

MMC may refer to:

== Arts, entertainment, and media ==
- Mickey Mouse Club, a long-running children's variety television series
- Mickey Mouse Clubhouse, a children's television series on Disney Jr.
- Monopoly Millionaires Club, a defunct American lottery game
- Museum Management and Curatorship, a journal

== Businesses and organizations ==
=== Automotive companies ===
- Maudslay Motor Company, a British vehicle maker company based in Coventry
- Mitsubishi Motors Corporation, a Japanese automobile company
- Morgan Motor Company, a British car manufacturing company
- Morris Motors, a former British car manufacturing company

=== Hospitals and medical colleges ===
==== United States ====
- Maine Medical Center, a hospital in Portland, Maine, U.S.
- Medicaid managed care, managed care organizations (MCOs) that accept a set payment – "capitation" – for these services
- Meharry Medical College, a medical college in North Nashville, Tennessee, U.S.
- Memorial Medical Center (Springfield, Illinois), a hospital in Springfield, Illinois, U.S.
- MetroWest Medical Center, a teaching hospital in Framingham, Massachusetts, U.S.
- Montefiore Medical Center, a hospital in the Bronx, New York, U.S.

==== Elsewhere ====
- Mackay Medical College, a medical college in New Taipei City, Taiwan
- Madras Medical College, a medical college in Chennai, Tamil Nadu, India
- Makati Medical Center, a tertiary hospital in Makati, Philippines
- Metropolitan Medical Center, a tertiary hospital in Tondo, Manila, Philippines
- Monash Medical Centre, a tertiary hospital in Clayton, Victoria, Australia
- Muhammad Medical College, a medical college in Mirpurkhas, Sindh, Pakistan
- Mymensingh Medical College, a medical college in Mymensingh, Bangladesh

=== Other schools ===
- Martin Methodist College, a private, liberal arts college in Pulaski, Tennessee, U.S.
- Marymount Manhattan College, a liberal arts college in Manhattan, U.S.
- Miles Macdonell Collegiate, a high school in Winnipeg, Manitoba, Canada

=== Other businesses ===
- Mail.com Media Corp, now Penske Media Corporation
- Marsh McLennan, an American-based global professional services firm
- Material Móvil y Construcciones (MMC), a predecessor company to Construcciones y Auxiliar de Ferrocarriles
- MMC Corporation Berhad, a Malaysian investment holding company
- MMC Norilsk Nickel (Nornickel), a Russian mining and smelting company
- MyMajorCompany, a fan-funded music label based in the UK and France

=== Other organizations ===
- Manang Marsyangdi Club, a leading football club in Nepal
- Manbij Military Council, a military council established by the Syrian Democratic Forces
- The Marine Mammal Center, an institution for marine mammal research and medicine
- Matara Municipal Council, the local council for Matara, Sri Lanka
- Mongols Motorcycle Club, an international outlaw motorcycle club
- Monopolies & Mergers Commission, the former name of the British Competition Commission
- Multimedia Center, Zagreb, Croatia, a Multimedia Center of the Zagreb University Referral Center

== Personal titles and credentials ==
- Master Municipal Clerk, a certification in the US for a municipal clerk
- Merchant Mariner Credential, a professional qualification document for those in the maritime industry
- Member of the Magic Circle, initials used after one's name to denote membership to The Magic Circle
- Member of Municipal Council, a member of municipal councils in Sri Lanka

== Places ==
- Madhavaram Milk Colony, a neighbourhood in northern part of the city Chennai, Tamil Nadu, India
- Moore Market Complex, a terminus in Chennai, Tamil Nadu, India

== Science and technology ==
=== Astronomy ===
- Maddalena's cloud, a giant molecular cloud in Monoceros
- Mini Magellanic Cloud, a separated section of the Small Magellanic Cloud galaxy

=== Biology and medicine ===
==== Drugs ====
- Methenmadinone caproate, a progestin that was never marketed
- Mitomycin C, a DNA crosslinker used in cancer treatment as an anti-tumour antibiotic chemotherapeutic agent
- 3-MMC (3-Methylmethcathinone), a designer drug
- 4-MMC (4-Methylmethcathinone), a stimulant drug

==== Other uses in medicine ====
- Medical male circumcision
- Migrating motor complex, a cleaning reflex of the gastrointestinal tract
- Modernising Medical Careers, a programme for postgraduate medical training introduced in the UK in 2005
- Myelomeningocele, a kind of Spina bifida congenital defect of the spine

=== Computing ===
- M/M/c queue, a multi-server queueing model
- Malicious mobile code, malware
- Memory management controller, a special series of microprocessors designed to expand the capabilities of certain games for the Nintendo Entertainment System
- Microsoft Management Console, a framework for system administration tools in modern Microsoft Windows operating systems
- MIDI Machine Control, part of the MIDI specification
- Mobile-to-mobile convergence, a technology used to handle wireless traffic in telephony and computer networks
- MultiMedia Commands, a multimedia command set for computer storage buses
- MultiMedia controller, such as the eMMC
- MultiMediaCard, a solid state disk or flash memory data storage device

=== Other uses in science and technology ===
- Maximum material condition, in geometric dimensioning and tolerancing
- Metal matrix composite, a type of composite material with fibers dispersed in a metallic matrix
- Modern methods of construction (MMC, such as Modular, Volumetric or Panelised Construction)
- Modular Multi-Level Converter, a sort of power electronics converter
- Moving Micro Cross, a cartridge type developed by Bang & Olufsen to replace ceramic pickups in high fidelity systems

== Vehicles ==
- Minor model change, another term for an automotive facelift
- Alexander Dennis Enviro200 MMC, a single-decker city bus manufactured by Alexander Dennis
- Alexander Dennis Enviro400 MMC, a 2-axle bus model manufactured by Alexander Dennis
- Alexander Dennis Enviro500 MMC, a 3-axle double-decker bus manufactured by Alexander Dennis
- Coastal minelayer (MMC), a US Navy hull classification symbol

== Other uses ==
- 2100 AD (MMC), a year in the Common Era, in the future of the second millennium, denoted in Roman numerals
- Multi-member constituency, part of an election system; see Electoral district

== See also ==
- MCC (disambiguation)
- MC (disambiguation)
