= Corona Australis Molecular Cloud =

Molecular cloud in constellation Corona Australis

Nebula
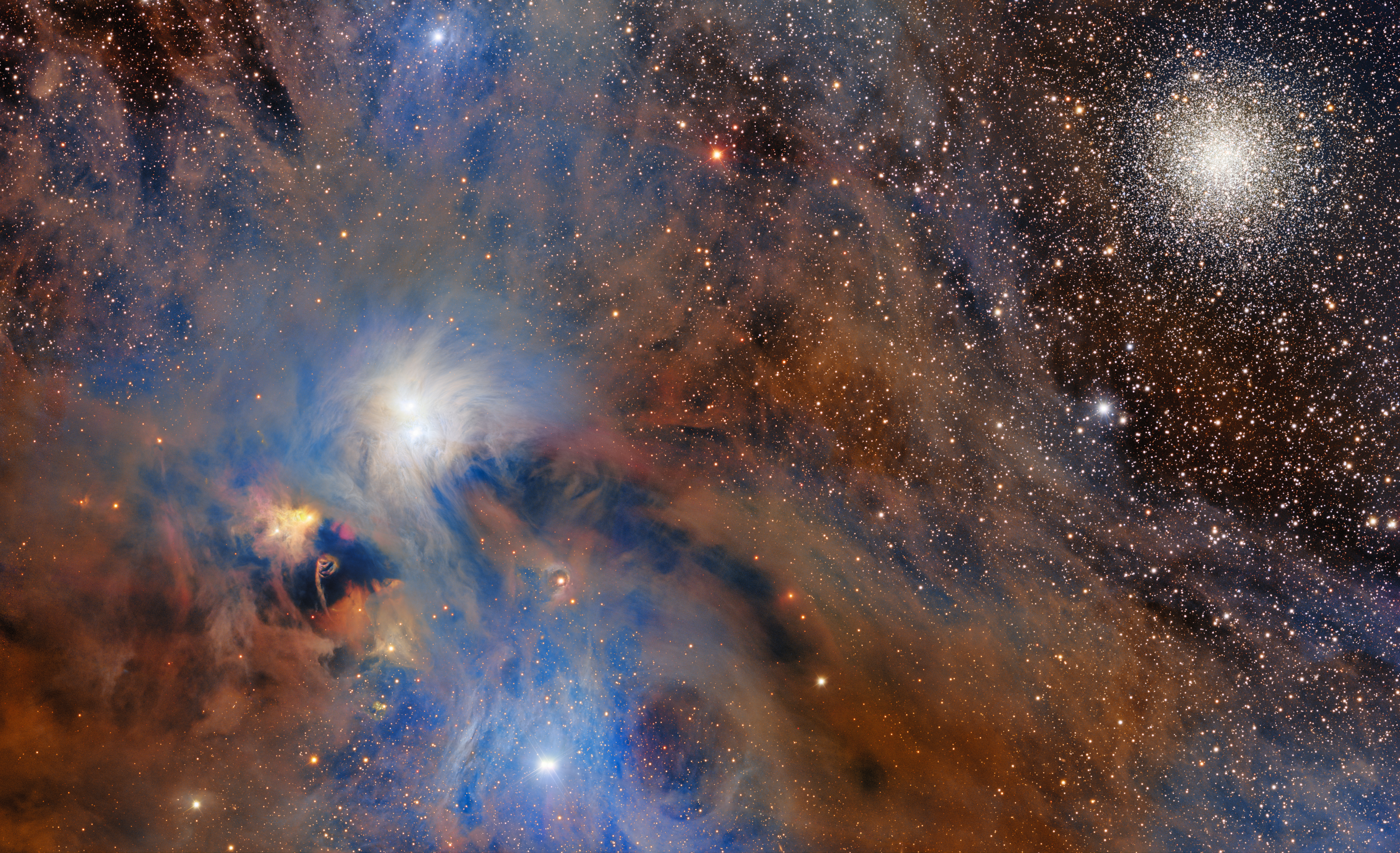
- Corona Australis Molecular Cloud imaged by DECam

Observation data: J2000.0 epoch
- Right ascension: 19^{h} 01^{m} 51^{s}
- Declination: –36° 58.9′
- Distance: 425 ly (130 pc)
- Apparent dimensions (V): 16.0° × 6.5°
- Constellation: Corona Australis

Physical characteristics
- Radius: 8 ly
- Designations: CrA Dark Cloud, CrA MCLD, CrA region

The Corona Australis molecular cloud, located at a distance of 130 parsecs (~430 ly), is a dark nebula of gas and dust and is one of the nearest star formation regions from Earth. Sometimes referred to as the CrA Dark Cloud or the CrA Cloud, it hosts several reflection nebulae − NGC 6729, NGC 6726/6727, and IC 4812 being the most notable. The globular cluster known as NGC 6723, which appears close by, is actually 29,000ly away, and so not part of the region. The cloud is located in the constellation Corona Australis, close to the border with Sagittarius, between Gamma Coronae Australis and Epsilon Coronae Australis and stretches roughly 8ly across.

The cloud is located at about 18% below the galactic plane and covers an angular area of 16.0° × 6.5° on the celestial sphere. Temperatures of the cloud ranges from 13–22 K, and there is a total of about 7,000 times the mass of the Sun in material. Over half of the mass of the complex is concentrated around a small area, and this is the most active star-forming region. There are embedded infrared sources within the complex. A total of 425 infrared sources have been detected near the L1688 cloud. These are presumed to be young stellar objects, including 16 classified as protostars, 123 T Tauri stars with dense circumstellar disks, and 77 weaker T Tauri stars with thinner disks. The last two categories of stars have estimated ages ranging from 100,000 to a million years.

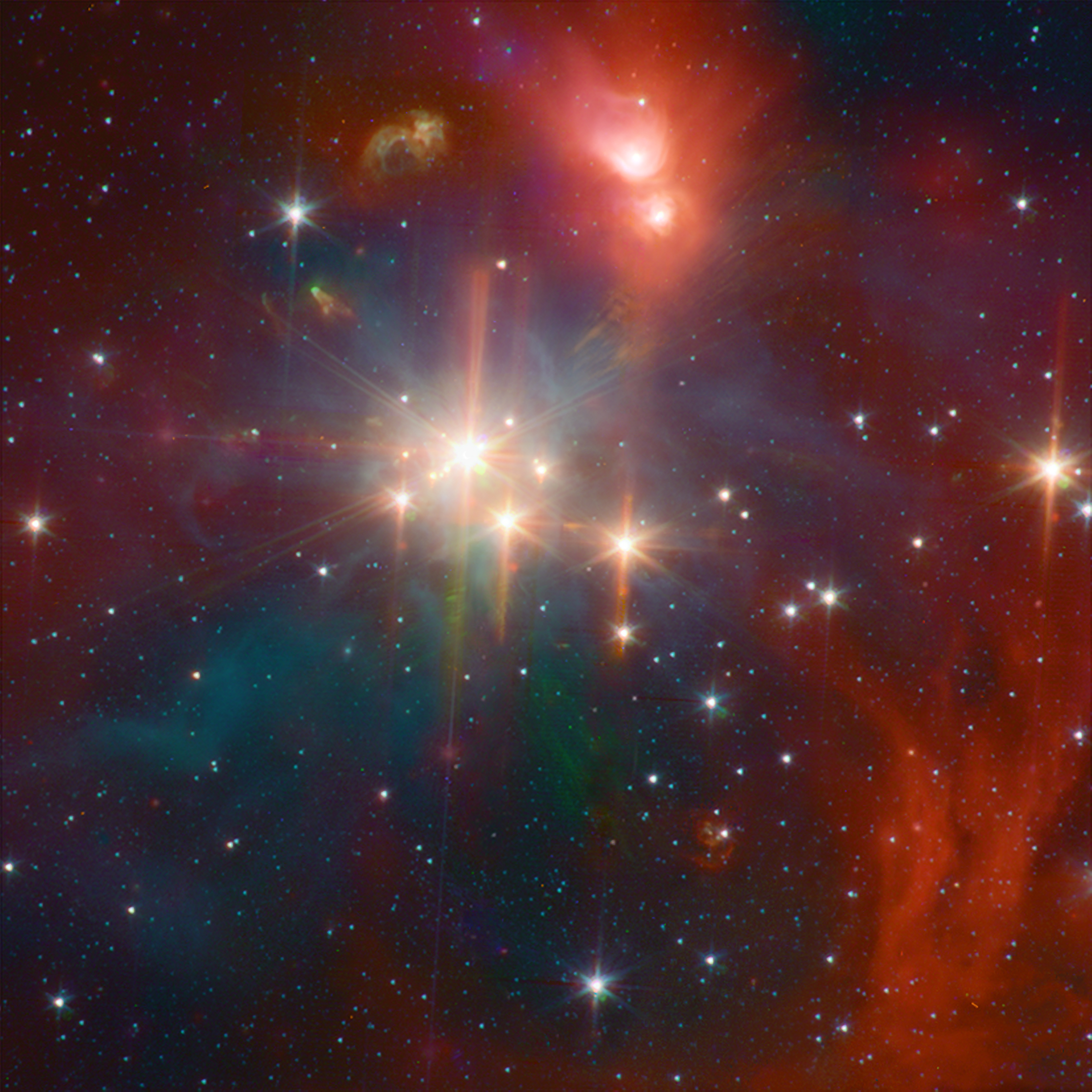
Infrared photo of the Coronet Cluster at the heart of the molecular cloud complex.

Known to exhibit significant extinction, as high as 45 magnitudes at visual wavelengths (A_{V}~45 mag), astronomers have identified 55 distinct optical members within the CrA Cloud as of 2008. At the core is the Coronet protostar cluster, a loose collection of about 30 young stars with a wide range of masses at various stages of evolution. Surrounding the cluster are a few late stage B stars, numerous Herbig–Haro objects, and several YSOs. At the opposite end of the mass spectrum, are two confirmed brown dwarfs along with seven more candidates. There are also many embedded infrared sources within the complex. The molecular cloud has been most widely surveyed in the infrared, X-rays, radio waves and in the millimeter continuum.

== Observations ==
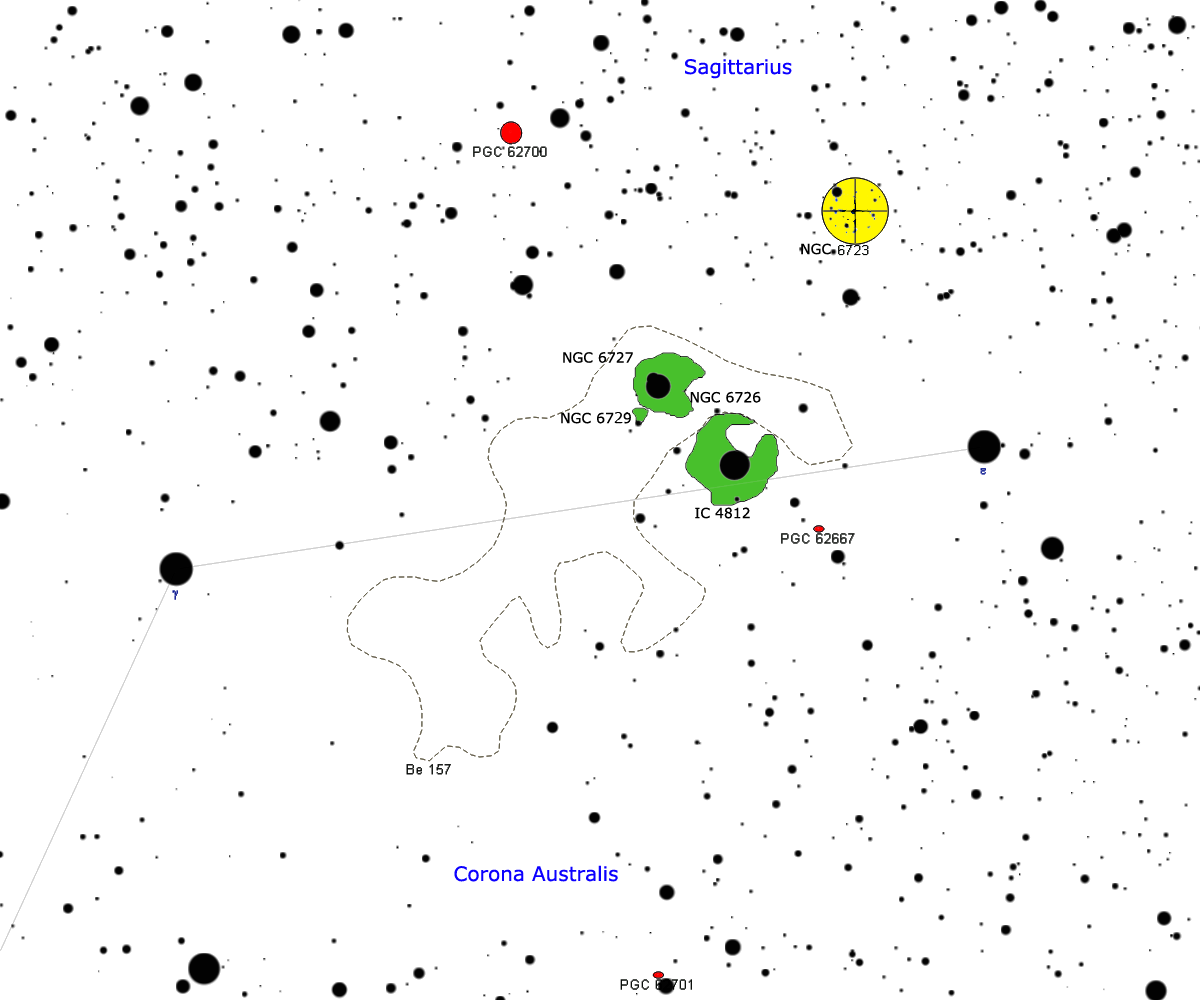
Map showing the location and boundaries of the CrA molecular cloud complex.

In the north of the constellation is the Corona Australis Molecular Cloud, a dark molecular cloud with many embedded reflection nebulae, including NGC 6729, NGC 6726–7, and IC 4812. A star-forming region of around 7000 M_{☉}, it contains Herbig–Haro objects, T Tauri stars with dense circumstellar disks, (protostars) and some very young stars. Located about 430 light years (130 parsecs) away, it is one of the closest star-forming regions to our solar system. The related NGC 6726 and 6727, along with unrelated NGC 6729, were first recorded by Johann Friedrich Julius Schmidt in 1865.

== Gallery ==
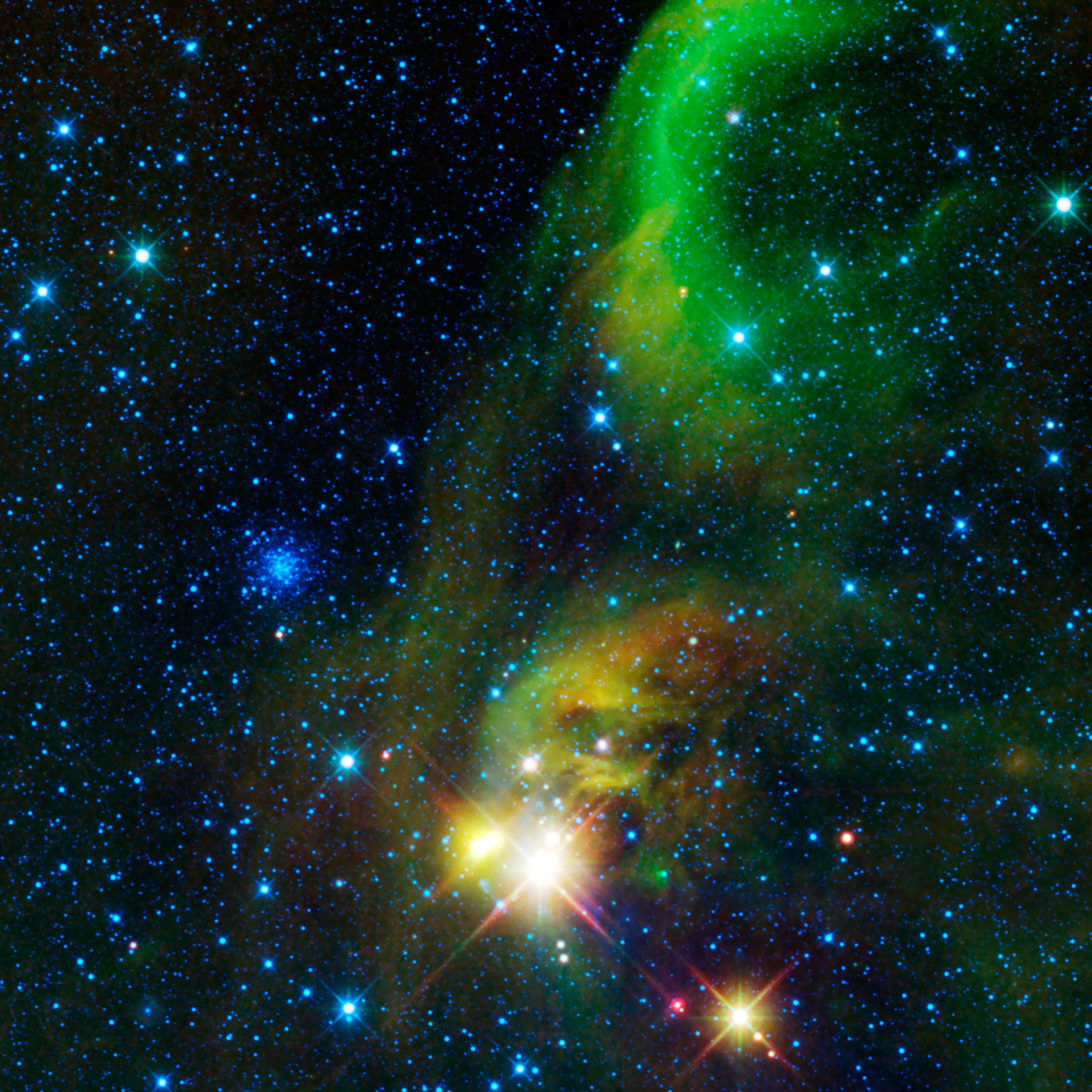
WISE infrared photo showing NGC 6723, NGC 6726-6727 and NGC 6729.

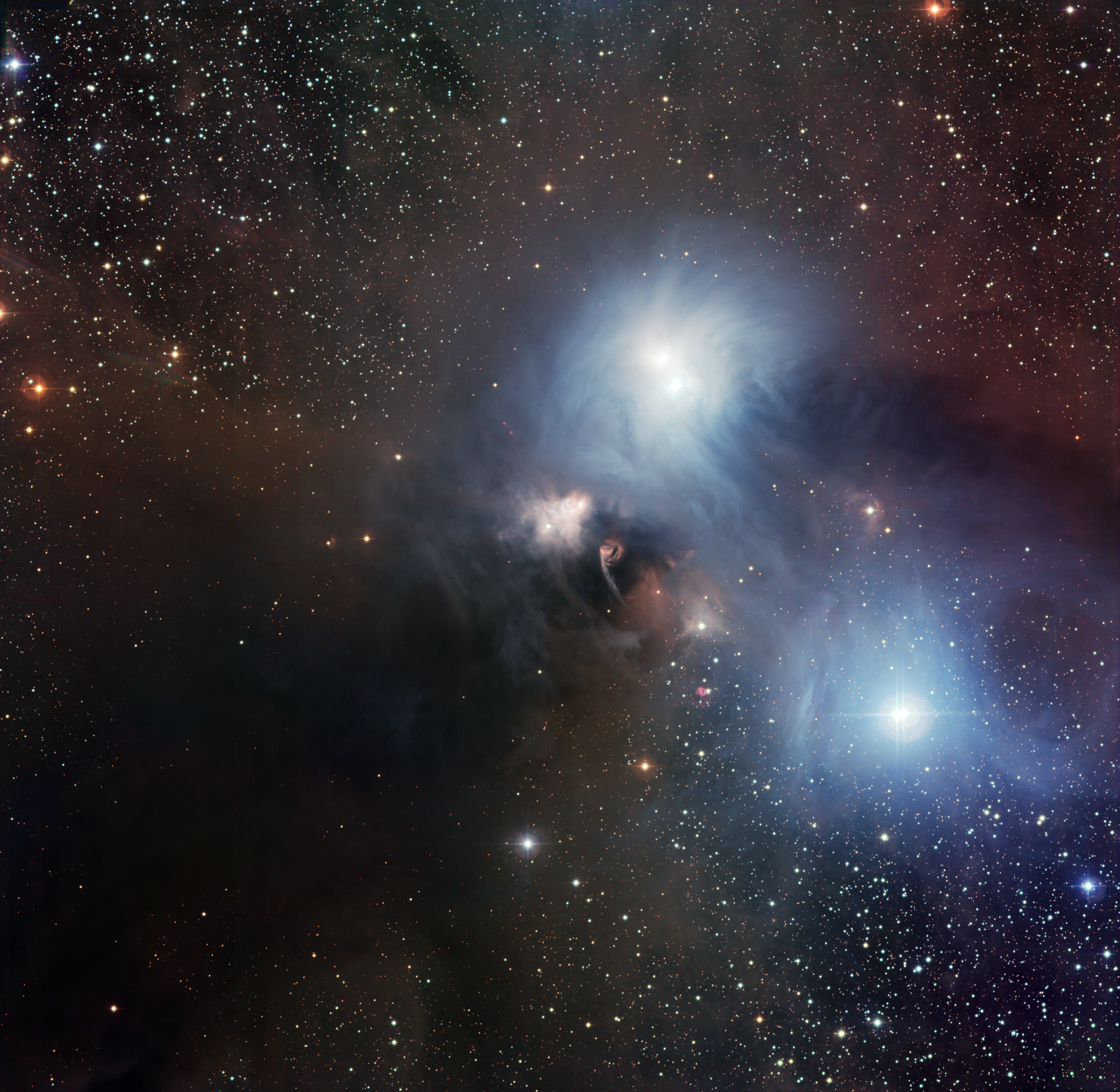
The R CrA region at the heart of the CrA Dark Cloud.

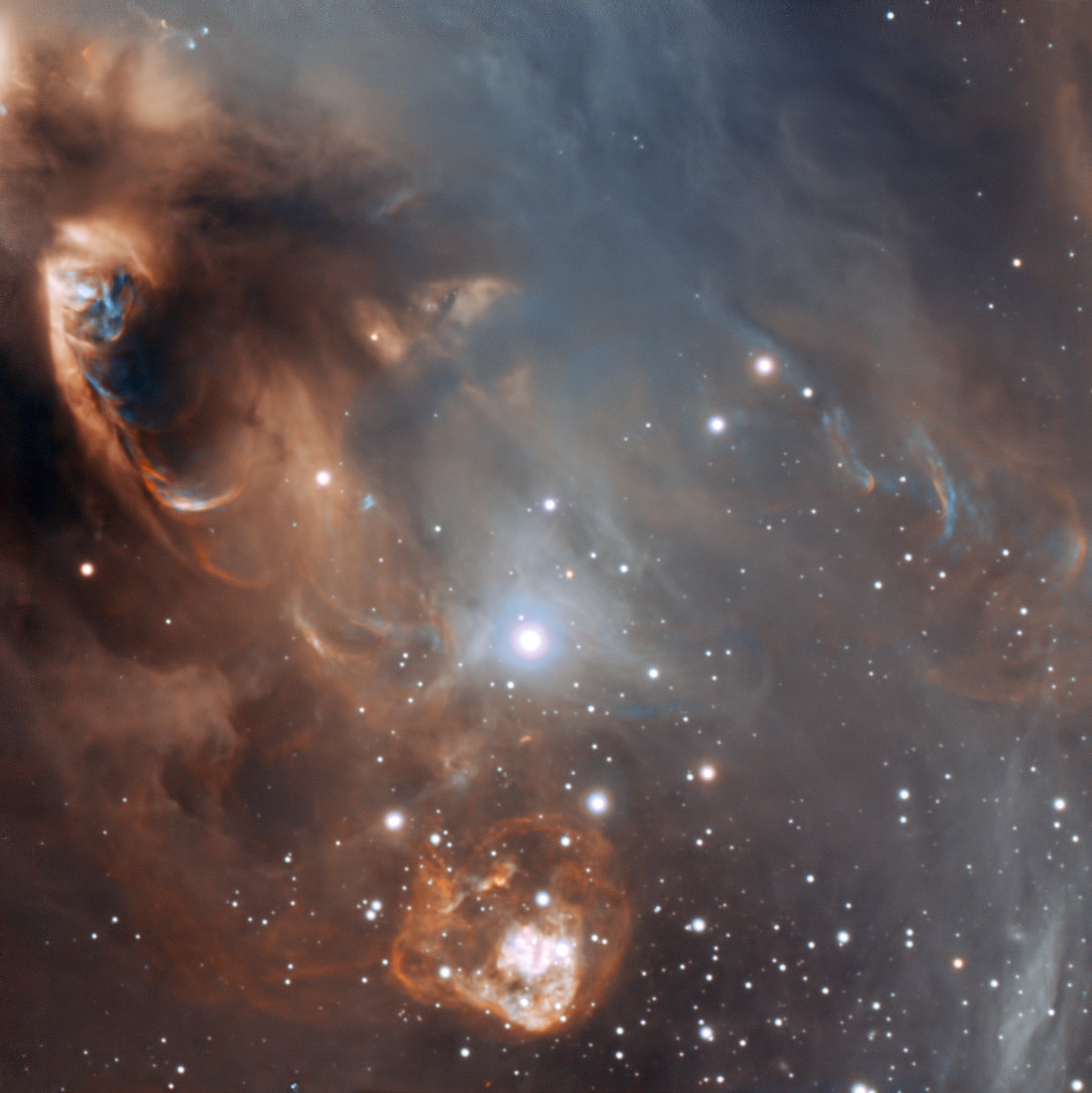
Star-forming region NGC 6729 showing the dramatic birth of very young stars.

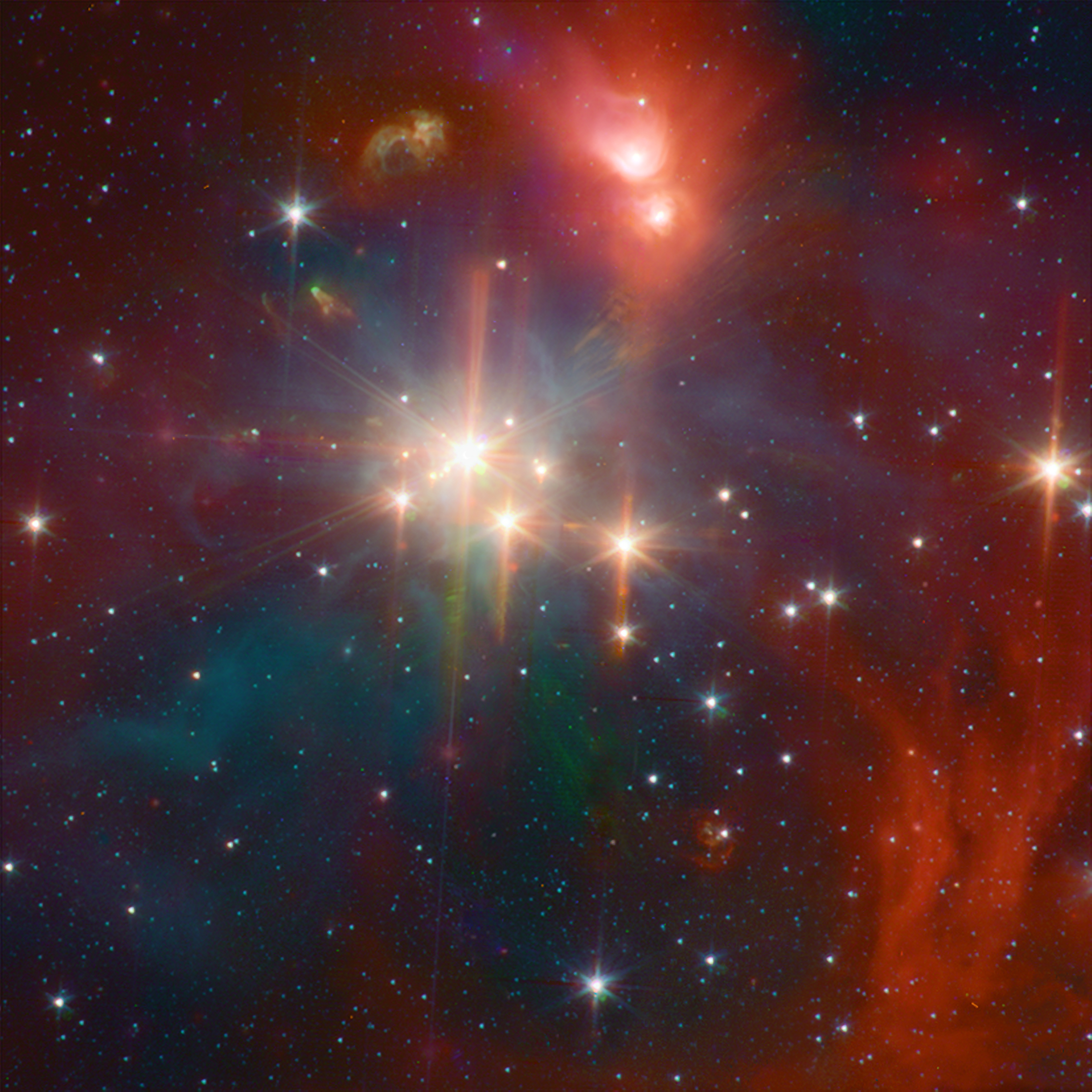
Infrared photo of the Coronet Cluster within the R CrA region. R CrA is the bright star in the center.

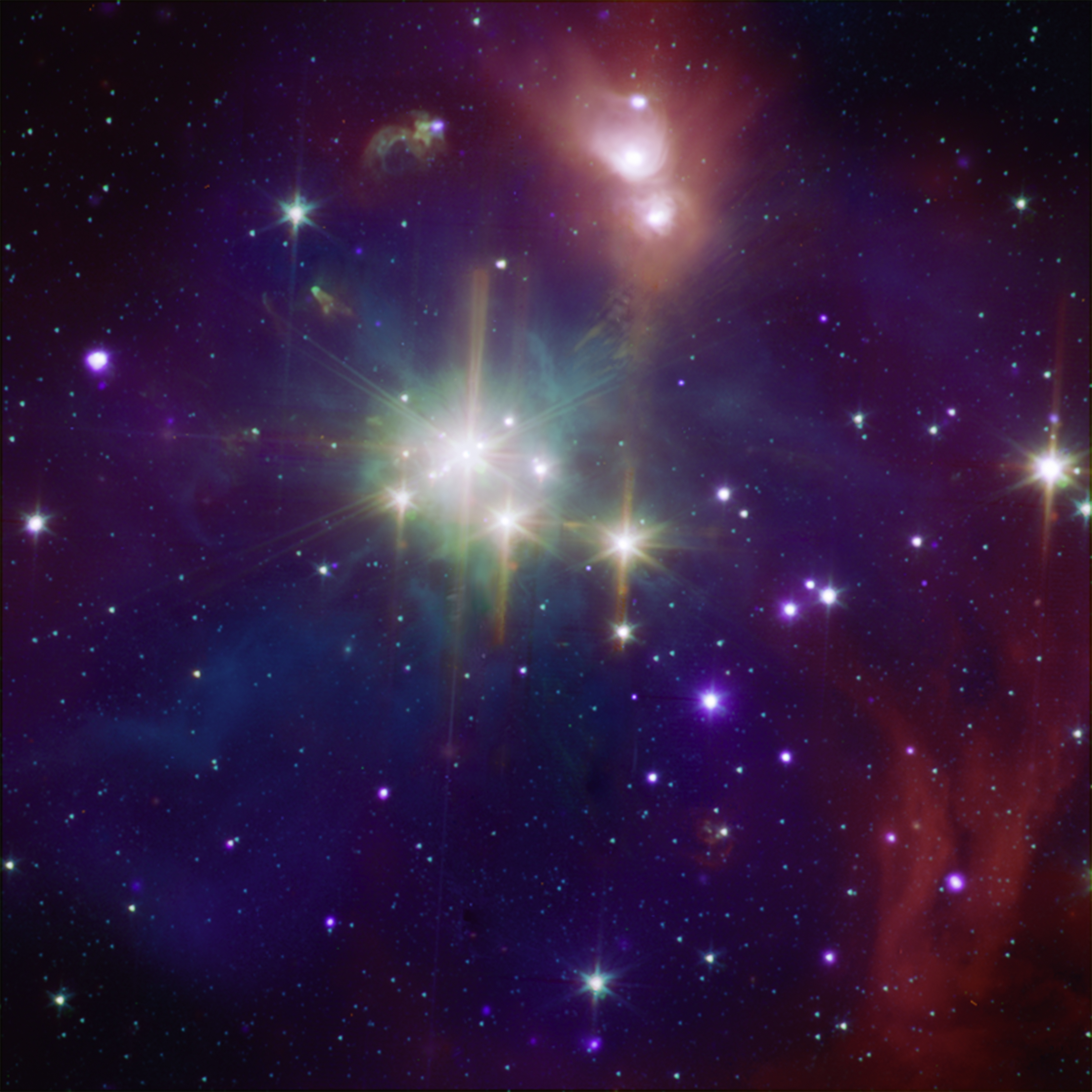
Composite image shows the Coronet Cluster in X-rays from Chandra and infrared from Spitzer.
