= Interstellar ice =

Ice that forms in the interstellar medium

Interstellar ice consists of grains of volatiles in the ice phase that form in the interstellar medium. Ice and dust grains form the primary material out of which the Solar System was formed. Grains of ice are found in the dense regions of molecular clouds, where new stars are formed. Temperatures in these regions can be as low as 10 K (−263 °C; −442 °F), allowing molecules that collide with grains to form an icy mantle. Thereafter, atoms undergo thermal motion across the surface, eventually forming bonds with other atoms. This results in the formation of water and methanol. Indeed, the ices are dominated by water and methanol, as well as ammonia, carbon monoxide and carbon dioxide. Frozen formaldehyde and molecular hydrogen may also be present. Found in lower abundances are nitriles, ketones, esters and carbonyl sulfide. The mantles of interstellar ice grains are generally amorphous, becoming crystalline only in the presence of a star.

The composition of interstellar ice can be determined through its infrared spectrum. As starlight passes through a molecular cloud containing ice, molecules in the cloud absorb energy. This absorption occurs at the characteristic frequencies of vibration of the gas and dust. Ice features in the cloud are relatively prominently in this spectra, and the composition of the ice can be determined by comparison with samples of ice materials on Earth. In the sites directly observable from Earth, around 60–70% of the interstellar ice consists of water, which displays a strong emission at 3.05 μm from stretching of the O–H bond.

In September 2012, NASA scientists reported that polycyclic aromatic hydrocarbons (PAHs), subjected to interstellar medium (ISM) conditions, are transformed, through hydrogenation, oxygenation and hydroxylation, to more complex organics - "a step along the path toward amino acids and nucleotides, the raw materials of proteins and DNA, respectively". Further, as a result of these transformations, the PAHs lose their spectroscopic signature which could be one of the reasons "for the lack of PAH detection in interstellar ice grains, particularly the outer regions of cold, dense clouds or the upper molecular layers of protoplanetary disks."

== Older than the Sun ==
Research published in the journal Science estimates that about 30–50% of the water in the Solar System, such as the water on Earth, the discs around Saturn, and the meteorites of other planets, was present before the birth of the Sun.

== Comet 67P/Churyumov–Gerasimenko ==
On 18 November 2014, spacecraft Philae revealed presence of large amount of water ice on the comet 67P/Churyumov–Gerasimenko, the report stating that "the strength of the ice found under a layer of dust on the first landing site is surprisingly high". The team responsible for the MUPUS (Multi-Purpose Sensors for Surface and Sub-Surface Science) instrument, which hammered a probe into the comet, estimated that the comet is hard as ice. "Although the power of the hammer was gradually increased, we were not able to go deep into the surface," explained Tilman Spohn from the DLR Institute for Planetary Research, who led the research team.

== See also ==
- Amorphous ice
- Heavy water
