= Molecular cloud =

Type of interstellar cloud

A molecular cloud—sometimes called a stellar nursery if star formation is occurring within—is a type of interstellar cloud of which the density and size permit absorption nebulae, the formation of molecules (most commonly molecular hydrogen, H_{2}), and the formation of H II regions. This is in contrast to other areas of the interstellar medium that contain predominantly ionized gas.

Molecular hydrogen is difficult to detect by infrared and radio observations, so the molecule most often used to determine the presence of H_{2} is carbon monoxide (CO). The ratio between CO luminosity and H_{2} mass is thought to be constant, although there are reasons to doubt this assumption in observations of some other galaxies.

Within molecular clouds are regions with higher density, where much dust and many gas cores reside, called clumps. These clumps are the beginning of star formation if gravitational forces are sufficient to cause the dust and gas to collapse.

== Research and discovery ==
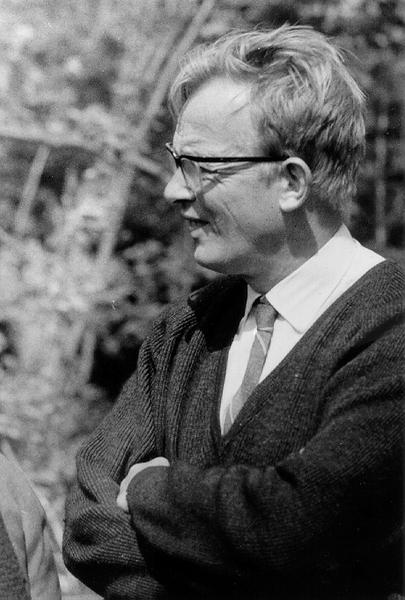
Astronomer Henk van de Hulst first theorized hydrogen could be traceable in interstellar space using radio signals.

The history pertaining to the discovery of molecular clouds is closely related to the development of radio astronomy and astrochemistry. During World War II, at a small gathering of scientists, Henk van de Hulst first reported he had calculated the neutral hydrogen atom should transmit a detectable radio signal. This discovery was an important step towards the research that would eventually lead to the detection of molecular clouds.

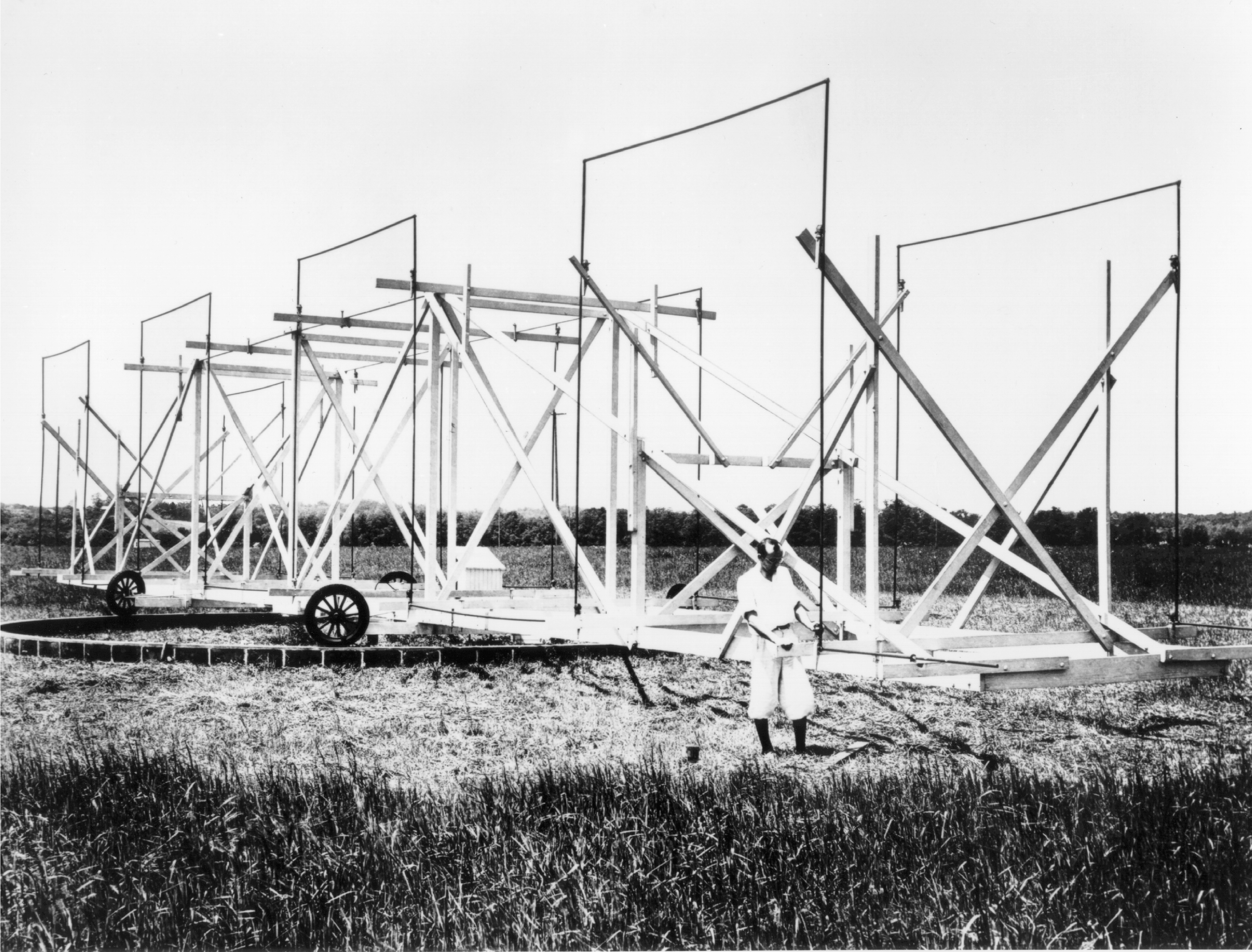
Jansky and his rotating directional radio antenna (early 1930s), the world's first radio telescope

Once the war ended, and aware of the pioneering radio astronomical observations performed by Jansky and Reber in the US, the Dutch astronomers repurposed the dish-shaped antennas running along the Dutch coastline that were once used by the Germans as a warning radar system and modified into radio telescopes, initiating the search for the hydrogen signature in the depths of space.

The neutral hydrogen atom consists of a proton with an electron in its orbit. Both the proton and the electron have a spin property. When the spin state flips from a parallel condition to antiparallel, which contains less energy, the atom gets rid of the excess energy by radiating a spectral line at a frequency of 1420.405 MHz.

This frequency is generally known as the 21 cm line, referring to its wavelength in the radio band. The 21 cm line is the signature of HI and makes the gas detectable to astronomers back on earth. The discovery of the 21 cm line was the first step towards the technology that would allow astronomers to detect compounds and molecules in interstellar space.

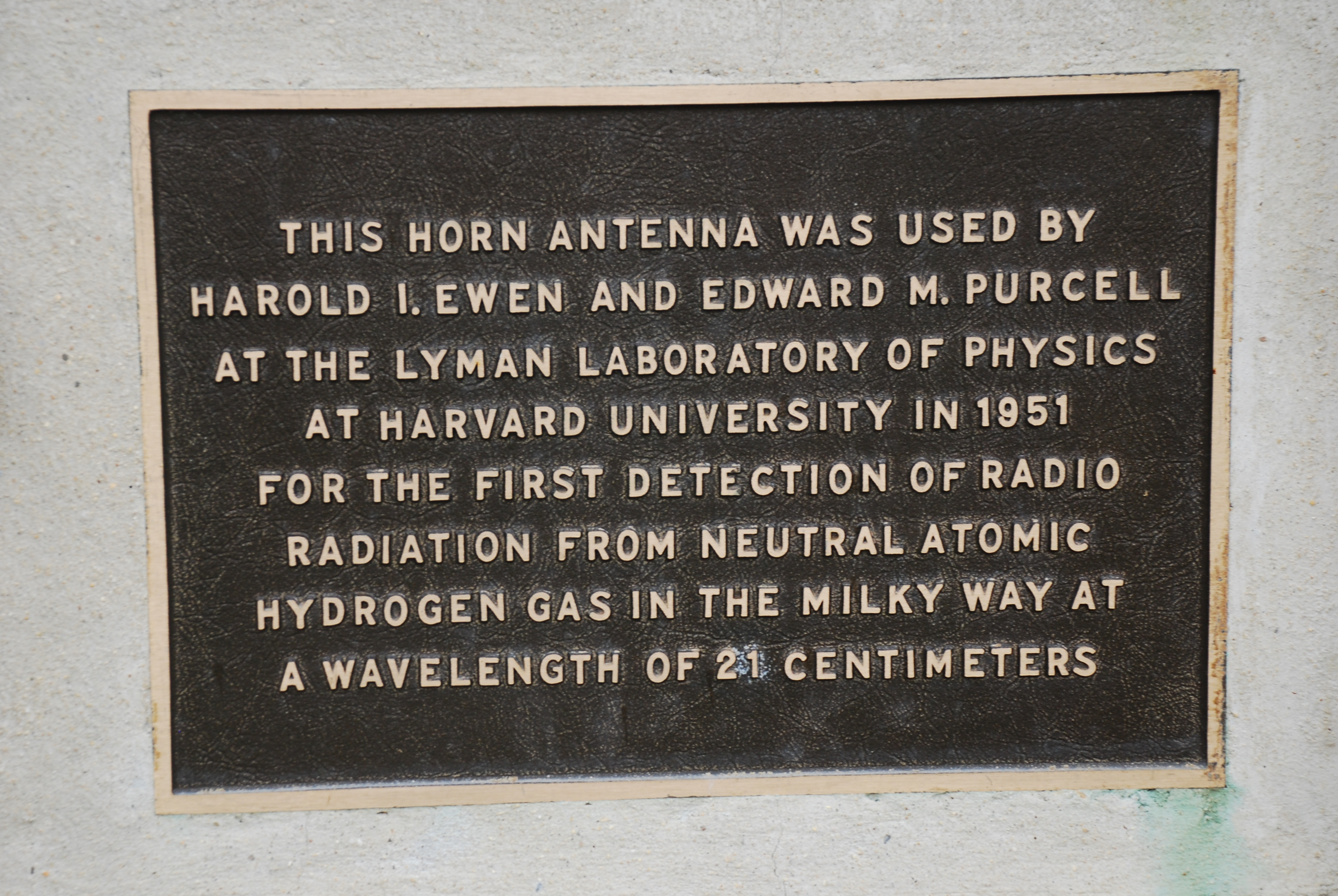
Plaque commemorating the discovery of 21-cm radiation from the Milky Way

In 1951, two research groups nearly simultaneously discovered radio emission from interstellar neutral hydrogen. Ewen and Purcell reported the detection of the 21-cm line in March, 1951. Using the radio telescope at the Kootwijk Observatory, Muller and Oort reported the detection of the hydrogen emission line in May of that same year.

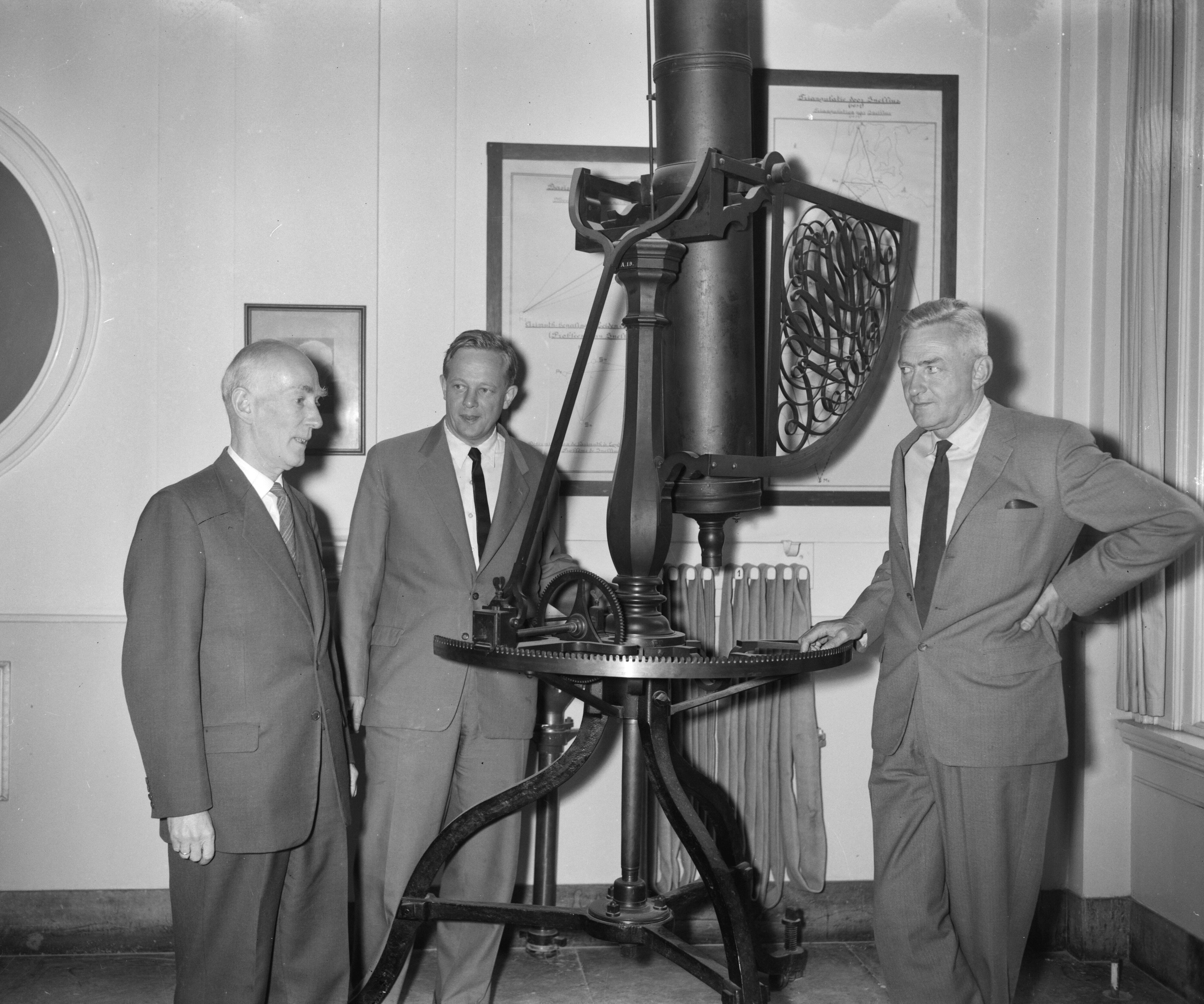
Left to right: Jan Oort, Hendrik C. van de Hulst, Pieter Oosterhoff. Jan Oort had a pivotal role in the research that lead to the discovery of molecular clouds.

Once the 21-cm emission line was detected, radio astronomers began mapping the neutral hydrogen distribution of the Milky Way Galaxy. Van de Hulst, Muller, and Oort, aided by a team of astronomers from Australia, published the Leiden-Sydney map of neutral hydrogen in the galactic disk in 1958 on the Monthly Notices of the Royal Astronomical Society. This was the first neutral hydrogen map of the galactic disc and also the first map showing the spiral arm structure within it.

Following the work on atomic hydrogen detection by van de Hulst, Oort and others, astronomers began to regularly use radio telescopes, this time looking for interstellar molecules. In 1963 Alan Barrett and Sander Weinreb at MIT found the emission line of OH in the supernova remnant Cassiopeia A. This was the first radio detection of an interstellar molecule at radio wavelengths. More interstellar OH detections quickly followed and in 1965, Harold Weaver and his team of radio astronomers at Berkeley, identified OH emissions lines coming from the direction of the Orion Nebula and in the constellation of Cassiopeia.

In 1968, Cheung, Rank, Townes, Thornton and Welch detected NH₃ inversion line radiation in interstellar space. A year later, Lewis Snyder and his colleagues found interstellar formaldehyde. Also in the same year George Carruthers managed to identify molecular hydrogen. The numerous detections of molecules in interstellar space would help pave the way to the discovery of molecular clouds in 1970.

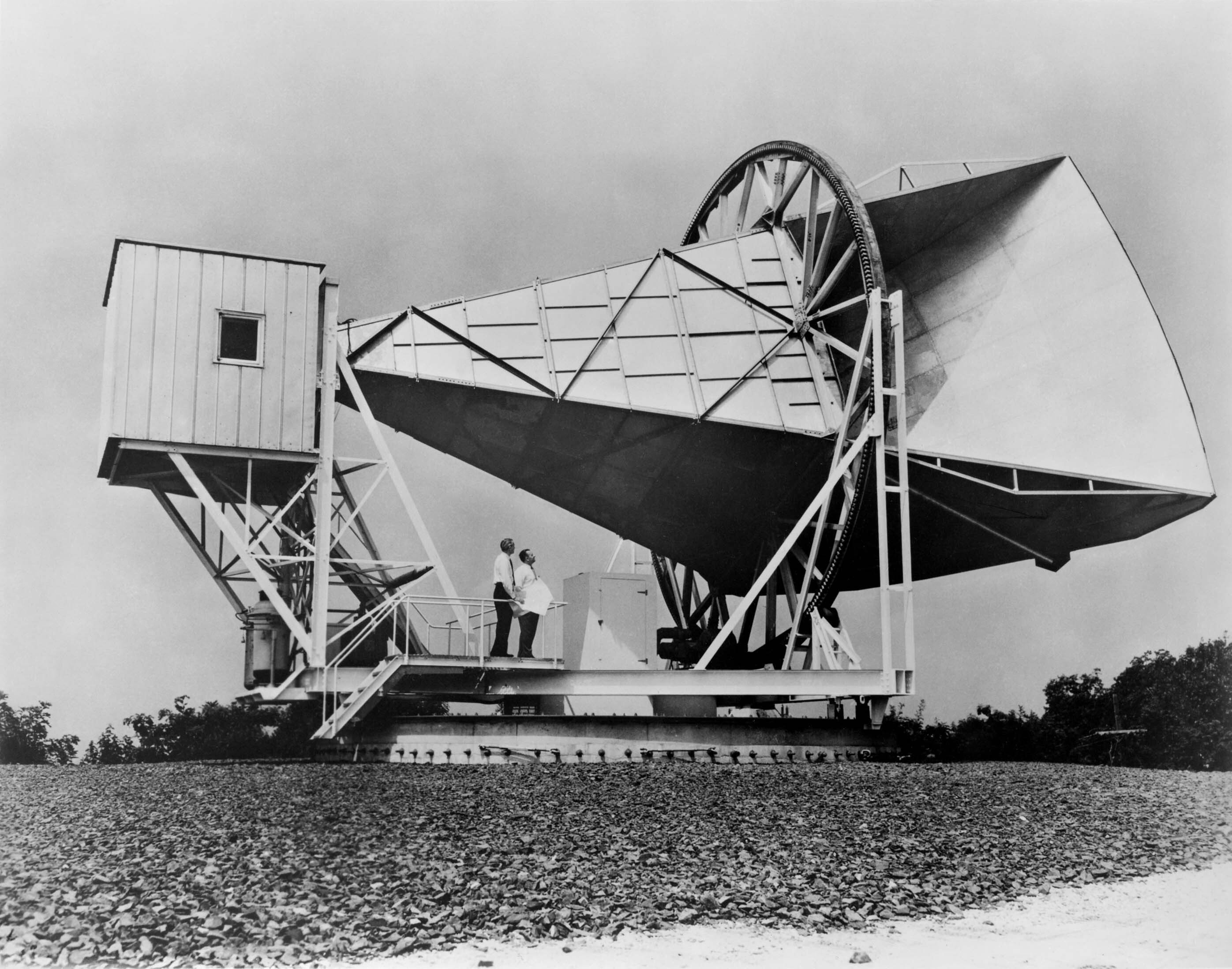
Penzias and Wilson with the Holmdel horn antenna used to detect microwave emissions from the Big Bang

Hydrogen is the most abundant species of atom in molecular clouds, and under the right conditions it will form the H_{2} molecule. Despite its abundance, the detection of H_{2} proved difficult. Due to its symmetrical molecule, H_{2} molecules have a weak rotational and vibrational modes, making it virtually invisible to direct observation.

The solution to this problem came when Arno Penzias, Keith Jefferts, and Robert Wilson identified CO in the star-forming region in the Omega Nebula. Carbon monoxide is a lot easier to detect than H_{2} because of its rotational energy and asymmetrical structure. CO soon became the primary tracer of the clouds where star-formation occurs.

In 1970, Penzias and his team quickly detected CO in other locations close to the galactic center, including the giant molecular cloud identified as Sagittarius B2, 390 light years from the galactic center, making it the first detection of a molecular cloud in history. This team later would receive the Nobel prize of physics for their discovery of microwave emission from the Big Bang.

Due to their pivotal role, research about these structures have only increased over time. A paper published in 2022 reports over 10,000 molecular clouds detected since the discovery of Sagittarius B2.

== Occurrence ==
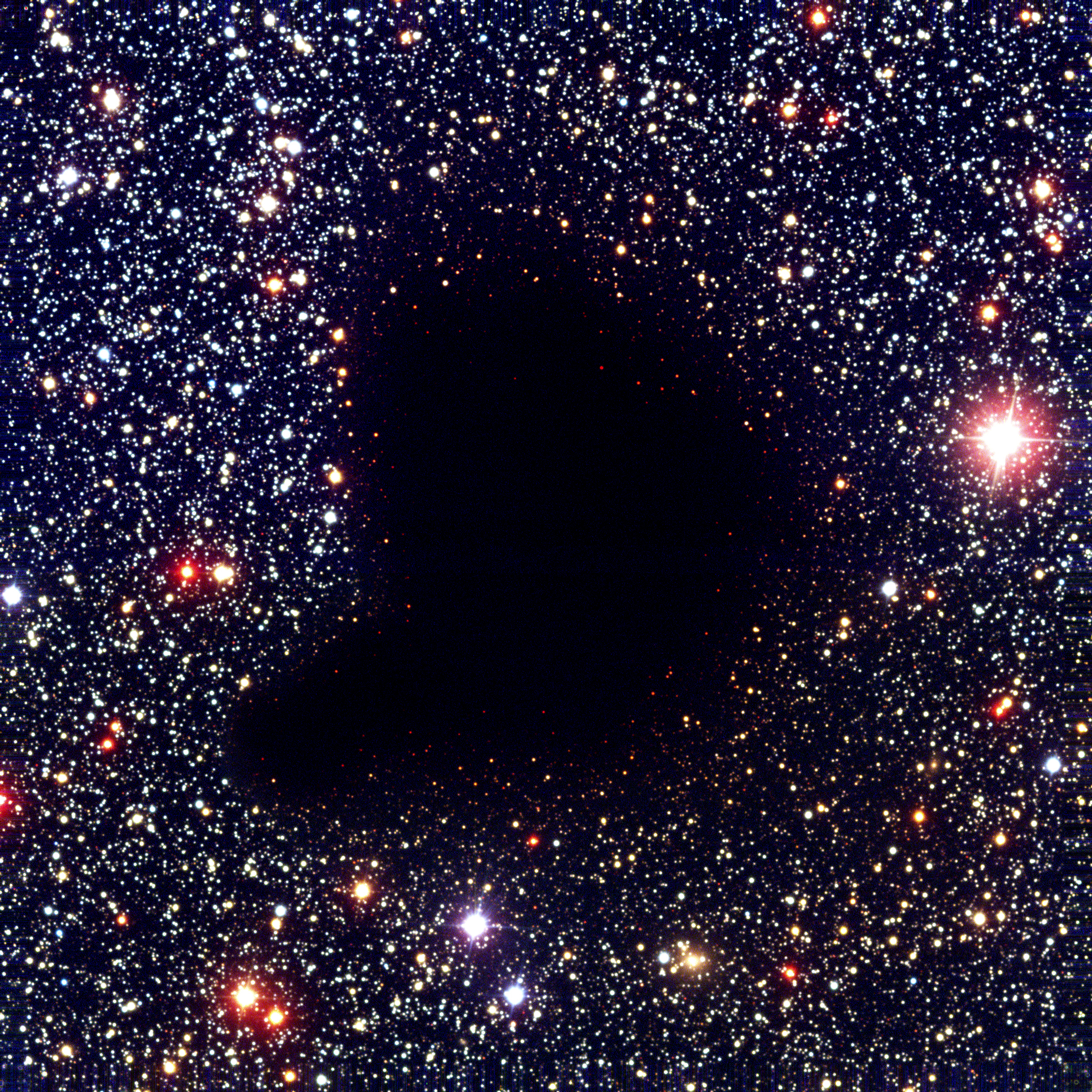
Molecular cloud Barnard 68, about 500 ly distant and 0.5 ly in diameter

Within the Milky Way, molecular gas clouds account for less than one percent of the volume of the interstellar medium (ISM), yet it is also the densest part of it. The bulk of the molecular gas is contained in a ring between 3.5 and 7.5 kiloparsecs (11,000 and 24,000 light-years) from the center of the Milky Way (the Sun is about 8.5 kiloparsecs from the center). Large scale CO maps of the galaxy show that the position of this gas correlates with the spiral arms of the galaxy. That molecular gas occurs predominantly in the spiral arms suggests that molecular clouds must form and dissociate on a timescale shorter than 10 million years—the time it takes for material to pass through the arm region.

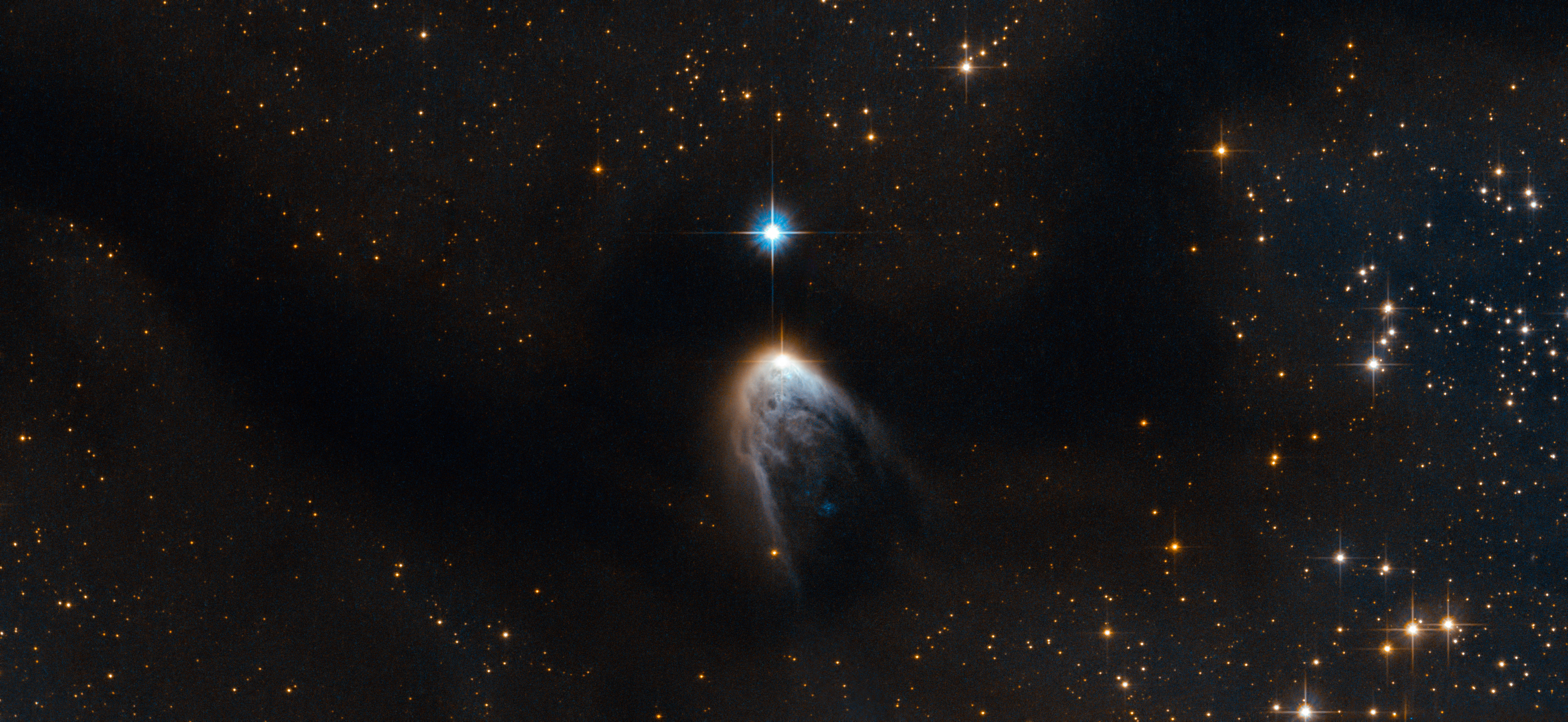
Circinus molecular cloud has a mass around 250,000 times that of the Sun.

Perpendicularly to the plane of the galaxy, the molecular gas inhabits the narrow midplane of the galactic disc with a characteristic scale height, Z, of approximately 50 to 75 parsecs, much thinner than the warm atomic (Z from 130 to 400 parsecs) and warm ionized (Z around 1000 parsecs) gaseous components of the ISM. The exceptions to the ionized-gas distribution are H II regions, which are bubbles of hot ionized gas created in molecular clouds by the intense radiation given off by young massive stars; and as such they have approximately the same vertical distribution as the molecular gas.

This distribution of molecular gas is averaged out over large distances; however, the small scale distribution of the gas is highly irregular, with most of it concentrated in discrete clouds and cloud complexes.

== General structure and chemistry of molecular clouds ==
Molecular clouds typically have interstellar medium densities of 10 to 30 cm^{−3}, and constitute approximately 50% of the total interstellar gas in a galaxy. Most of the gas is found in a molecular state. The visual boundaries of a molecular cloud is not where the cloud effectively ends, but where molecular gas changes to atomic gas in a fast transition, forming "envelopes" of mass, giving the impression of an edge to the cloud structure. The structure itself is generally irregular and filamentary.

Cosmic dust and ultraviolet radiation emitted by stars are key factors that determine not only gas and column density, but also the molecular composition of a cloud. The dust provides shielding to the molecular gas inside, preventing dissociation by the ultraviolet radiation. The dissociation caused by UV photons is the main mechanism for transforming molecular material back to the atomic state inside the cloud. Molecular content in a region of a molecular cloud can change rapidly due to variation in the radiation field and dust movement and disturbance.

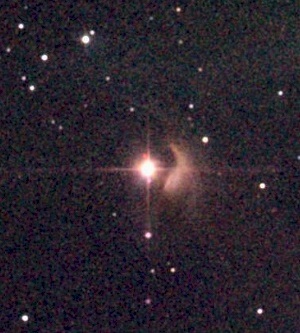
The star T Tauri with NGC 1555 cloud nearby

Most of the gas constituting a molecular cloud is molecular hydrogen, with carbon monoxide being the second most common compound. Molecular clouds also usually contain other elements and compounds. Astronomers have observed the presence of long chain compounds such as methanol, ethanol and benzene rings and their several hydrides. Large molecules known as polycyclic aromatic hydrocarbons have also been detected.

The density across a molecular cloud is fragmented and its regions can be generally categorized in clumps and cores. Clumps form the larger substructure of the cloud, having the average size of 1 pc. Clumps are the precursors of star clusters, though not every clump will eventually form stars. Cores are much smaller (by a factor of 10) and have higher densities. Cores are gravitationally bound and go through a collapse during star formation.

In astronomical terms, molecular clouds are short-lived structures that are either destroyed or go through major structural and chemical changes approximately 10 million years into their existence. Their short life span can be inferred from the range in age of young stars associated with them, of 10 to 20 million years, matching molecular clouds’ internal timescales.

Direct observation of T Tauri stars inside dark clouds and OB stars in star-forming regions match this predicted age span. The fact that OB stars older than 10 million years don’t have a significant amount of cloud material about them, seems to suggest most of the cloud is dispersed after this time. The lack of large amounts of frozen molecules inside the clouds also suggest a short-lived structure. Some astronomers propose the molecules never froze in very large quantities due to turbulence and the fast transition between atomic and molecular gas.

== Cloud formation and destruction ==
Due to their short lifespan, it follows that molecular clouds are constantly being assembled and destroyed. By calculating the rate at which stars are forming in our galaxy, astronomers are able to suggest the amount of interstellar gas being collected into star-forming molecular clouds in our galaxy. The rate of mass being assembled into stars is approximately 3 M_{☉} per year. Only 2% of the mass of a molecular cloud is assembled into stars, giving the number of 150 M_{☉} of gas being assembled in molecular clouds in the Milky Way per year.

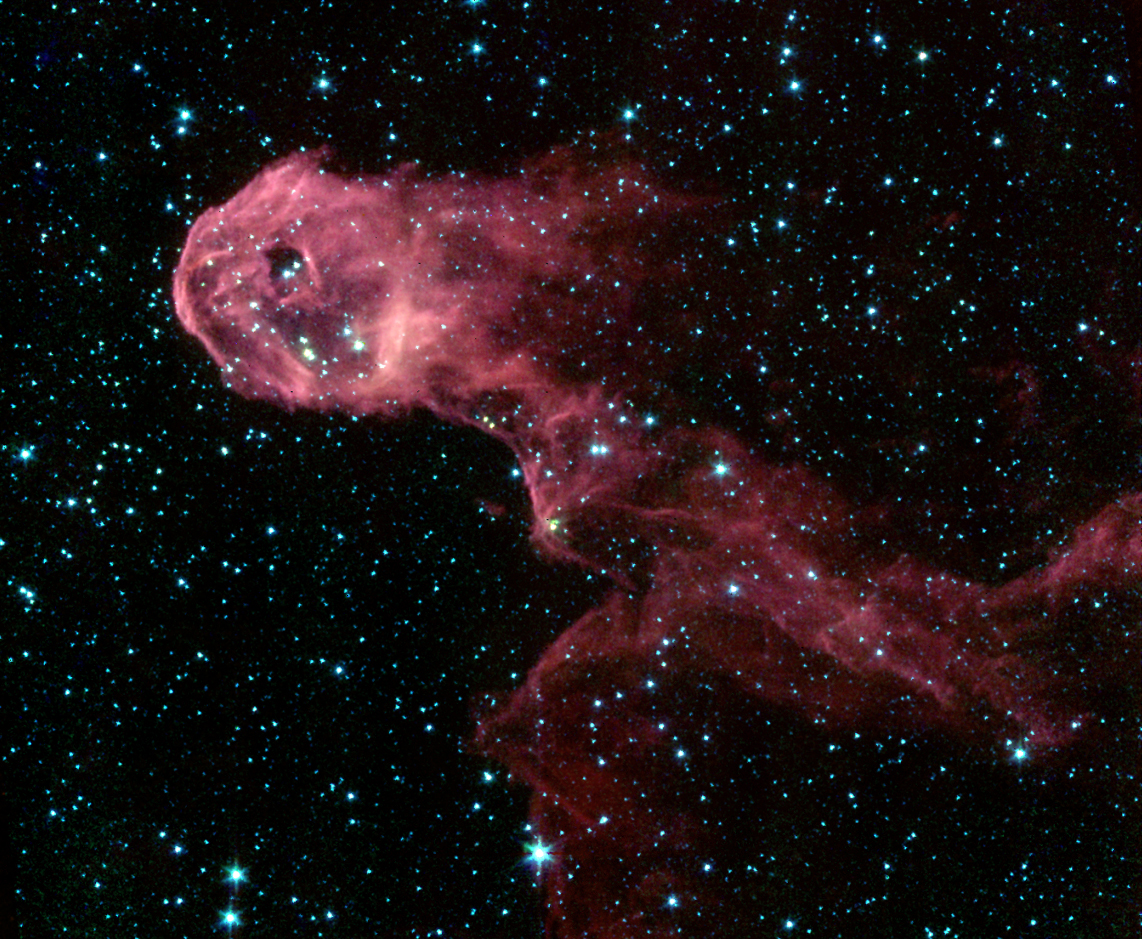
The Elephant's Trunk Nebula is an elongated dark globule. The globule is a condensation of dense gas that is barely surviving the strong ionizing radiation from a nearby massive star.

Two possible mechanisms for molecular cloud formation have been suggested by astronomers. Cloud growth by collision and gravitational instability in the gas layer spread throughout the galaxy. Models for the collision theory have shown it cannot be the main mechanism for cloud formation due to the very long timescale it would take to form a molecular cloud, beyond the average lifespan of such structures.

Gravitational instability is likely to be the main mechanism. Those regions with more gas will exert a greater gravitational force on their neighboring regions, and draw surrounding material. This extra material increases the density, increasing their gravitational attraction. Mathematical models of gravitational instability in the gas layer predict a formation time within the timescale for the estimated cloud formation time.

Once a molecular cloud assembles enough mass, the densest regions of the structure will start to collapse under gravity, creating star-forming clusters. This process is highly destructive to the cloud itself. Once stars are formed, they begin to ionize portions of the cloud around it due to their heat. The ionized gas then evaporates and is dispersed in formations called ‘champagne flows’. This process begins when approximately 2% of the mass of the cloud has been converted into stars. Stellar winds are also known to contribute to cloud dispersal. The cycle of cloud formation and destruction is closed when the gas dispersed by stars cools again and is pulled into new clouds by gravitational instability.

== Star formation ==
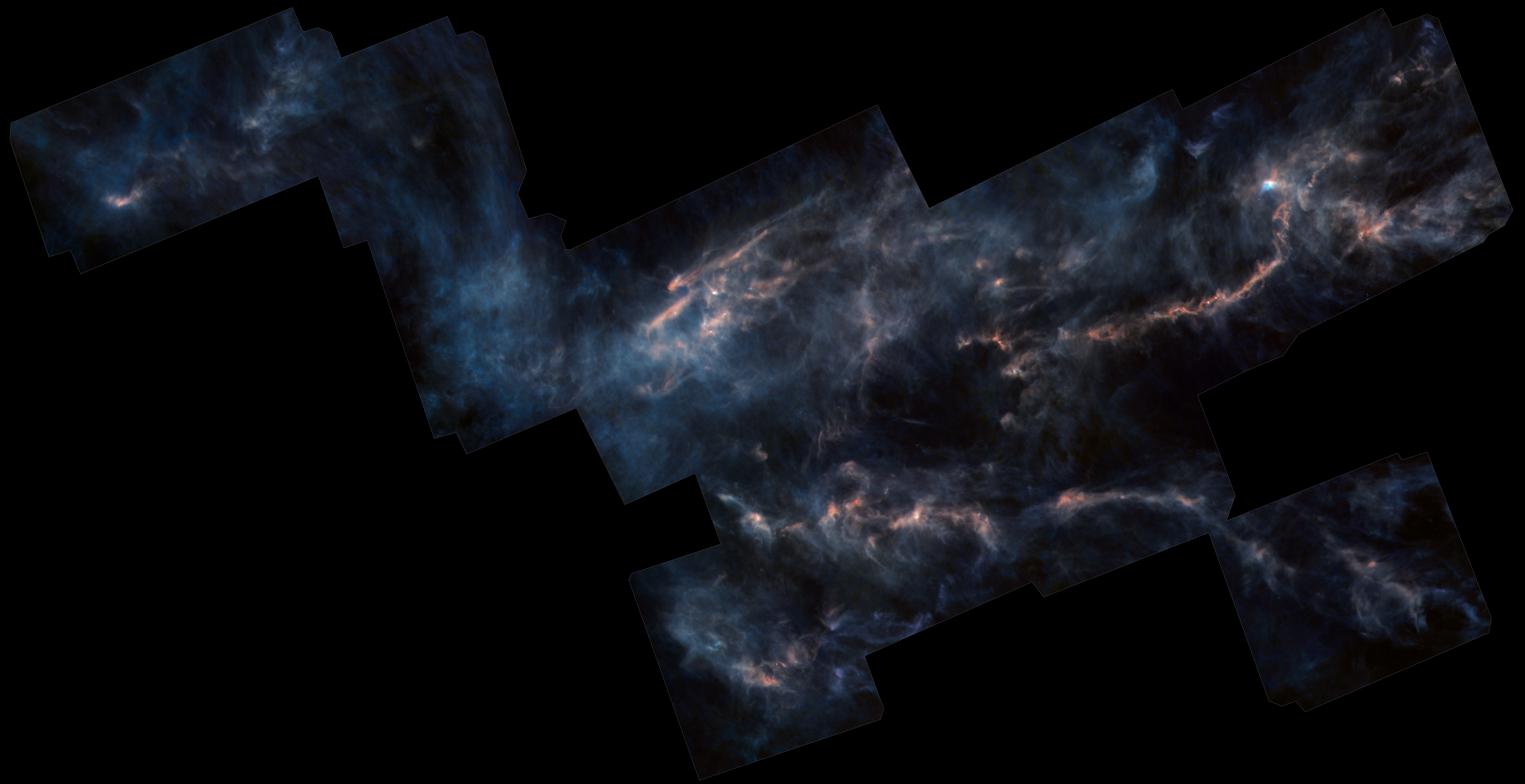
Taurus Molecular Cloud. Located about 430 light-years from us, this vast complex of interstellar clouds is where a large amount of stars are being born, and is the closest large region of star formation.

Star formation involves the collapse of the densest part of the molecular cloud, fragmenting the collapsed region in smaller clumps. These clumps aggregate more interstellar material, increasing in density by gravitational contraction. This process continues until the temperature reaches a point where the fusion of hydrogen can occur. The burning of hydrogen then generates enough heat to push against gravity, creating hydrostatic equilibrium. At this stage, a protostar is formed and it will continue to aggregate gas and dust from the cloud around it.

One of the most studied star formation regions is the Taurus molecular cloud due to its close proximity to earth (140 pc or 430 ly away), making it an excellent object to collect data about the relationship between molecular clouds and star formation. Embedded in the Taurus molecular cloud there are T Tauri stars. These are a class of variable stars in an early stage of stellar development and still gathering gas and dust from the cloud around them. Observation of star forming regions have helped astronomers develop theories about stellar evolution. Many O and B type stars have been observed in or very near molecular clouds. Since these star types belong to population I (some are less than 1 million years old), they cannot have moved far from their birth place. Many of these young stars are found embedded in cloud clusters, suggesting stars are formed inside it.

== Types of molecular cloud ==
=== Giant molecular clouds ===
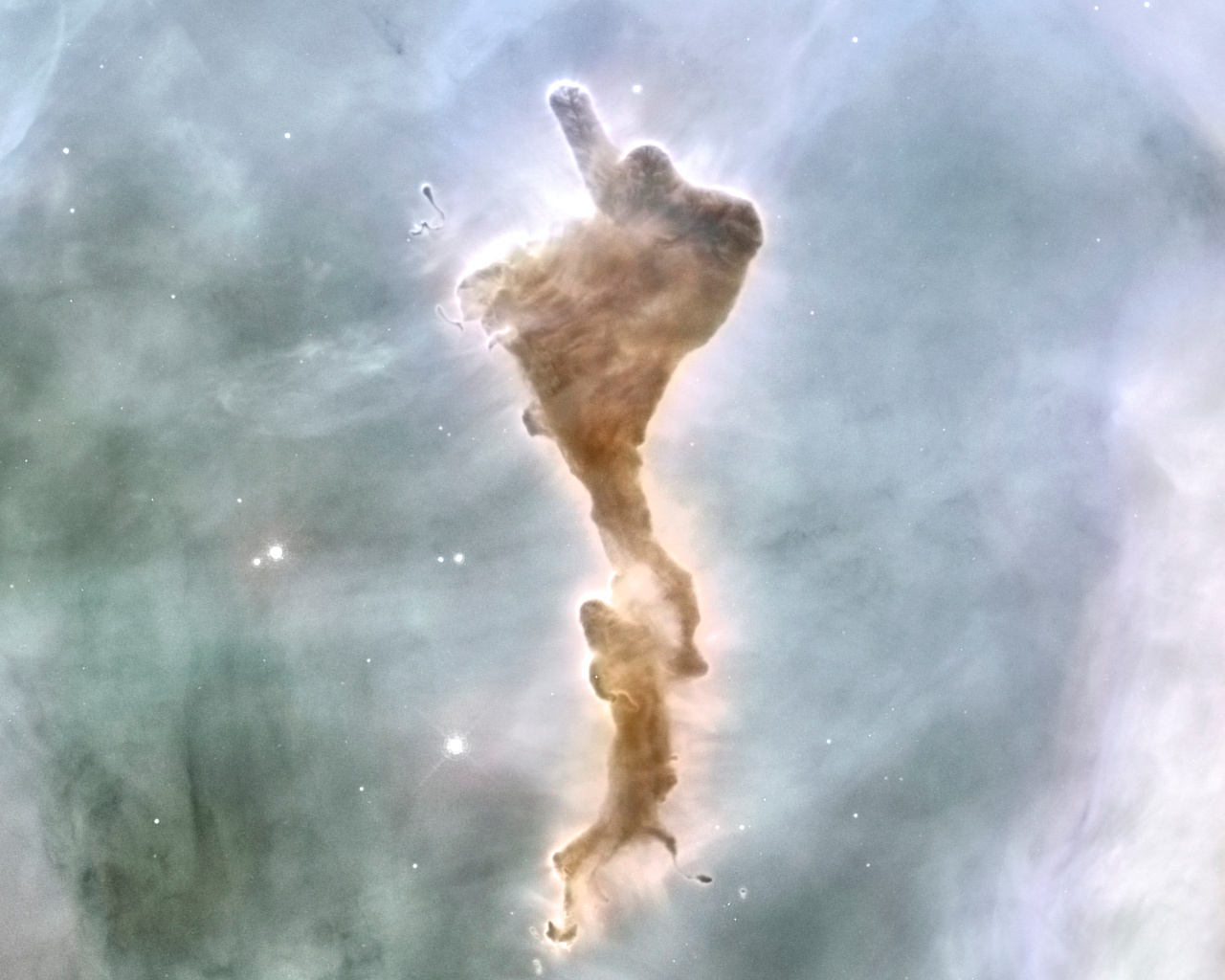
Within a few million years the light from bright stars will have boiled away this molecular cloud of gas and dust. The Finger of God Globule has broken off from the Carina Nebula. Newly formed stars are visible nearby, their images reddened by blue light being preferentially scattered by the pervasive dust. This image spans about two light-years and was taken by the Hubble Space Telescope in 1999.

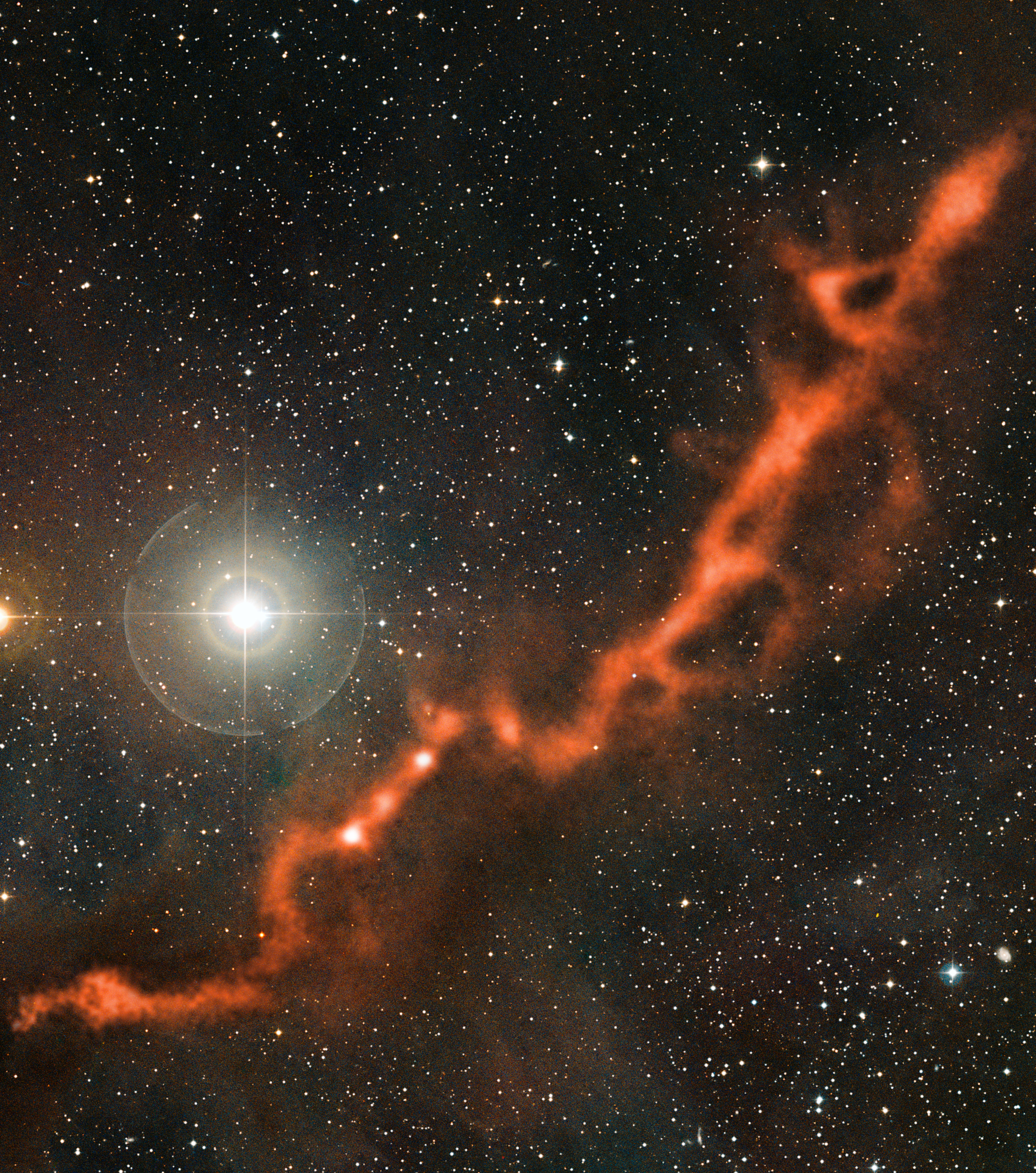
Part of the Taurus molecular cloud

A vast assemblage of molecular gas that has more than 10 thousand times the mass of the Sun is called a giant molecular cloud (GMC). GMCs are around 15 to 600 light-years (5 to 200 parsecs) in diameter, with typical masses of 10 thousand to 10 million solar masses. Whereas the average density in the solar vicinity is one particle per cubic centimetre, the average volume density of a GMC is about ten to a thousand times higher. Although the Sun is much denser than a GMC, the volume of a GMC is so great that it contains much more mass than the Sun. The substructure of a GMC is a complex pattern of filaments, sheets, bubbles, and irregular clumps.

Filaments are truly ubiquitous in the molecular cloud. Dense molecular filaments will fragment into gravitationally bound cores, most of which will evolve into stars. Continuous accretion of gas, geometrical bending, and magnetic fields may control the detailed fragmentation manner of the filaments. In supercritical filaments, observations have revealed quasi-periodic chains of dense cores with spacing of 0.15 parsec comparable to the filament inner width. A substantial fraction of filaments contained prestellar and protostellar cores, supporting the important role of filaments in gravitationally bound core formation. Recent studies have suggested that filamentary structures in molecular clouds play a crucial role in the initial conditions of star formation and the origin of the stellar IMF.

The densest parts of the filaments and clumps are called molecular cores, while the densest molecular cores are called dense molecular cores and have densities in excess of 10^{4} to 10^{6} particles per cubic centimeter. Typical molecular cores are traced with CO and dense molecular cores are traced with ammonia. The concentration of dust within molecular cores is normally sufficient to block light from background stars so that they appear in silhouette as dark nebulae.

GMCs are so large that local ones can cover a significant fraction of a constellation; thus they are often referred to by the name of that constellation, e.g. the Orion molecular cloud (OMC) or the Taurus molecular cloud (TMC). These local GMCs are arrayed in a ring in the neighborhood of the Sun coinciding with the Gould Belt. The most massive collection of molecular clouds in the galaxy forms an asymmetrical ring about the galactic center at a radius of 120 parsecs; the largest component of this ring is the Sagittarius B2 complex. The Sagittarius region is chemically rich and is often used as an exemplar by astronomers searching for new molecules in interstellar space.

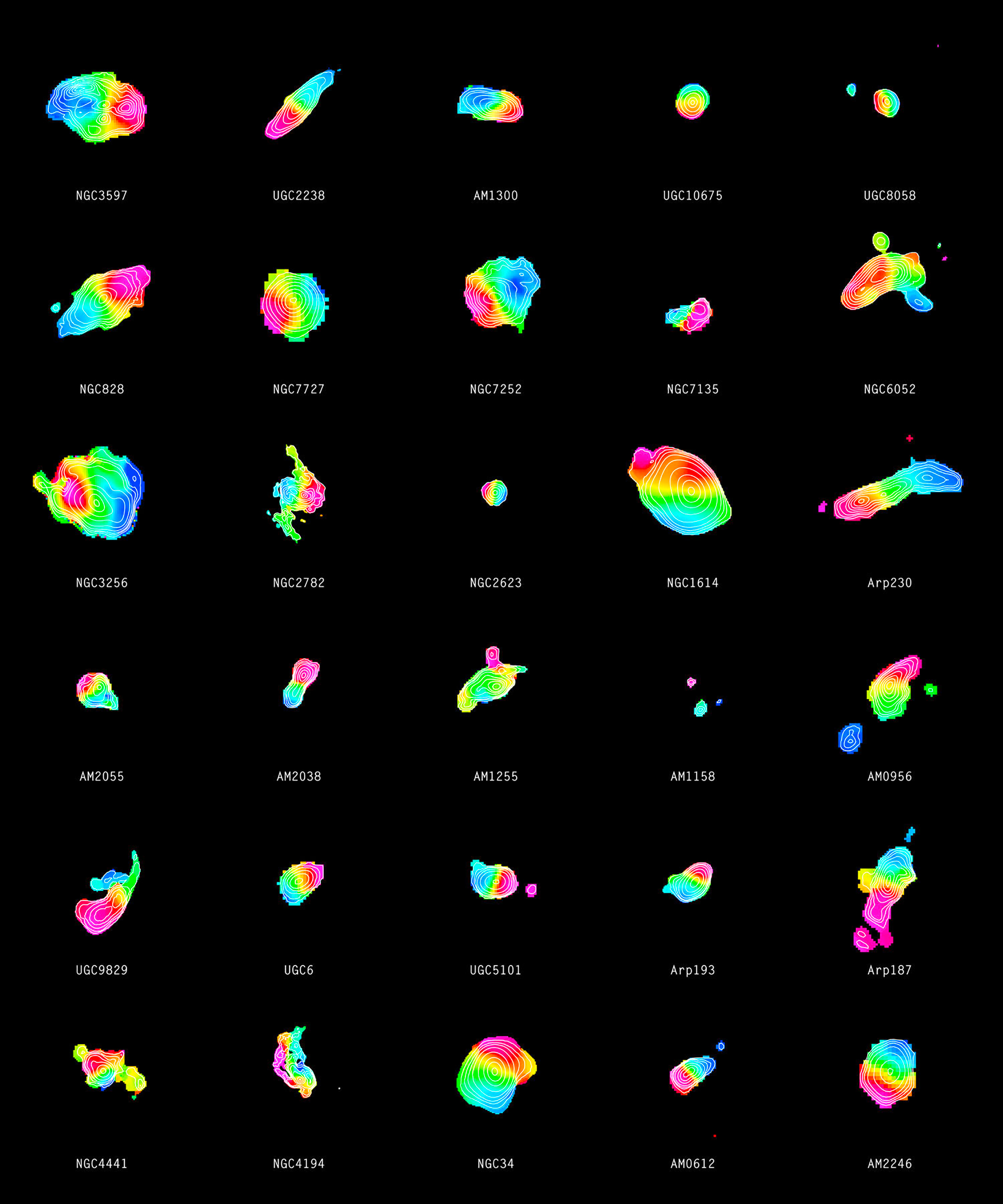
Distribution of molecular gas in 30 merging galaxies

=== Small molecular clouds ===
Isolated gravitationally-bound small molecular clouds with masses less than a few hundred times that of the Sun are called Bok globules. The densest parts of small molecular clouds are equivalent to the molecular cores found in GMCs and are often included in the same studies.

=== High-latitude diffuse molecular clouds ===
In 1984 IRAS identified a new type of diffuse molecular cloud. These were diffuse filamentary clouds that are visible at high galactic latitudes. These clouds have a typical density of 30 particles per cubic centimetre.

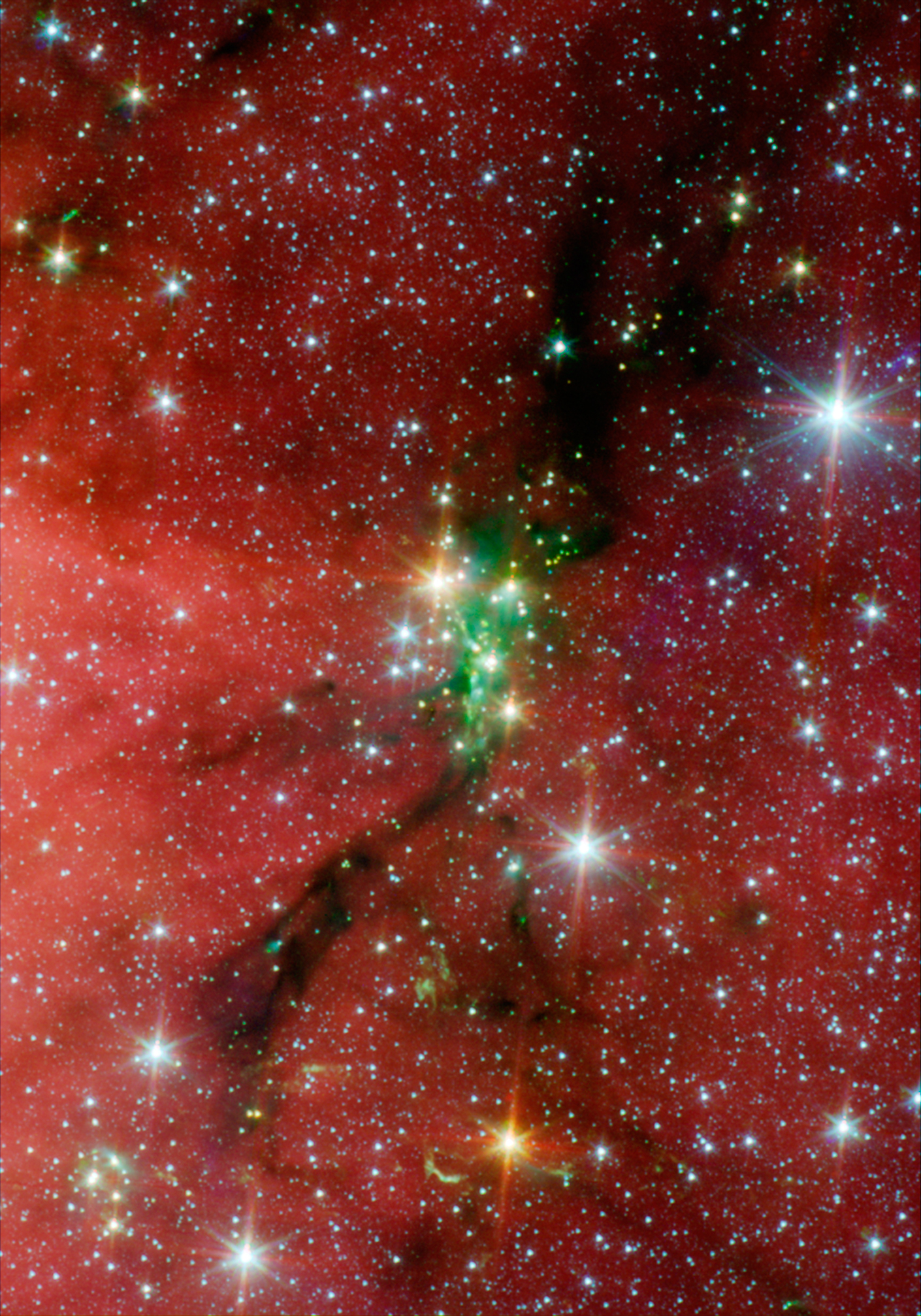
The Serpens South star cluster is embedded in a filamentary molecular cloud, seen as a dark ribbon passing vertically through the cluster. This cloud has served as a testbed for studies of molecular cloud stability.

== List of molecular cloud complexes ==
- Sagittarius B2
- Serpens-Aquila Rift
- Rho Ophiuchi cloud complex
- Rosette Molecular Cloud
- Corona Australis Molecular Cloud
- Musca–Chamaeleonis molecular cloud
- Maddalena's cloud
- Vela Molecular Ridge
- Radcliffe wave
  - Orion molecular cloud complex
  - Taurus molecular cloud
  - Perseus molecular cloud

== See also ==
- Accretion (astrophysics)
- Astrochemistry
- Atomic and molecular astrophysics
- Cosmic dust
- Cosmochemistry
- Evaporating gaseous globule
- Formation and evolution of the Solar System
- Interstellar ice
- List of interstellar and circumstellar molecules
- Nebula
- Orion molecular cloud complex
- Perseus molecular cloud
- Vela star-forming regions
