= Multimedia Center, Zagreb, Croatia =

Institution

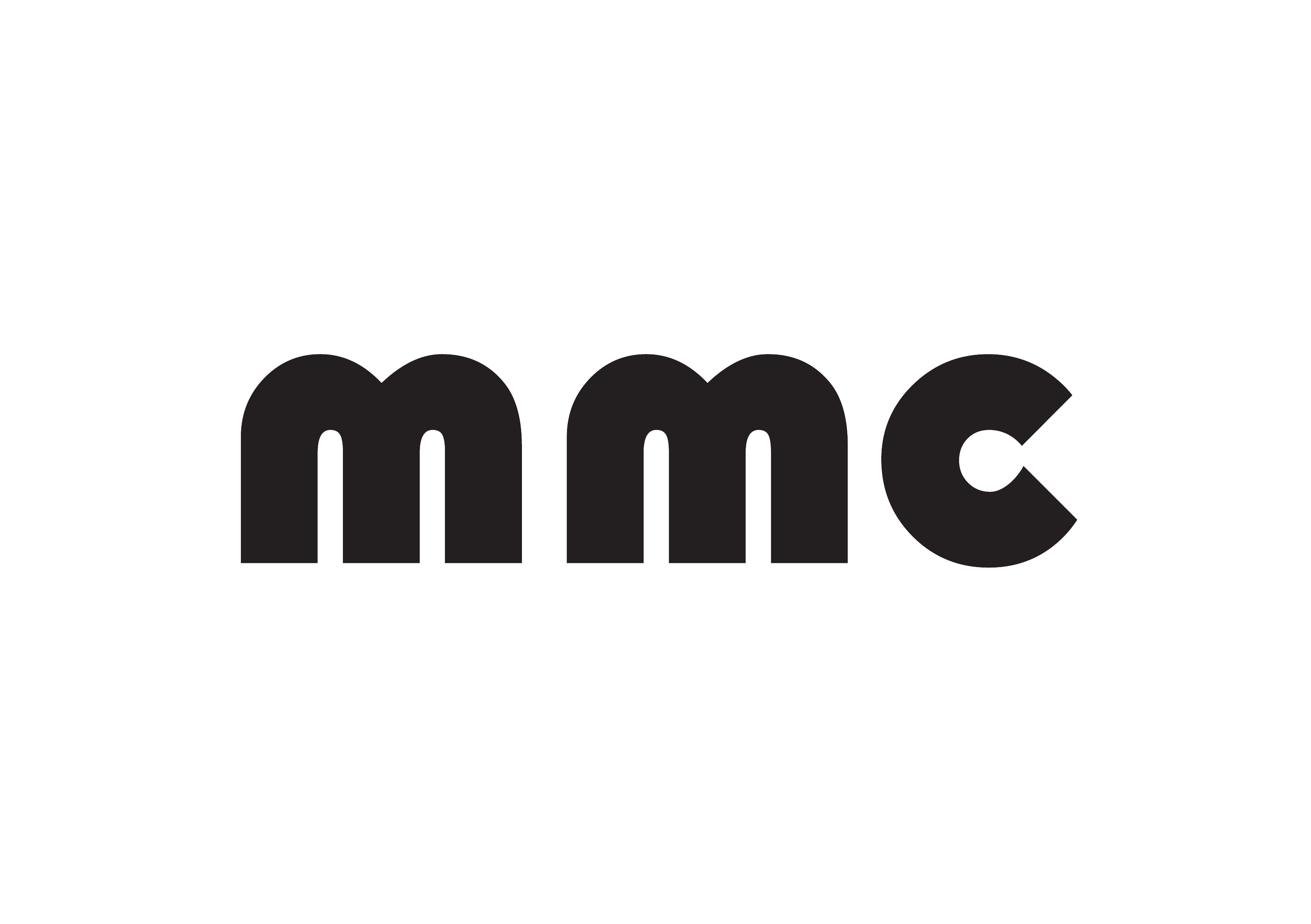
Multi-Media Center logo

The Multimedia Center of the Zagreb University Referral Center (MMC) was an institution which existed in Zagreb, Croatia, from 1972 to 1995.

MMC had a Hewlett-Packard HP 2000 Time-Sharing BASIC computer with 16 terminals which anybody was allowed to use completely free of charge.

== History ==
MMC was founded by professor Božo Težak.

== MMC activities ==
=== Day (08:00-20:00) ===
On weekdays the center was primarily used by secondary schools in Zagreb to introduce their pupils and teachers to IT by teaching them to program in elementary BASIC. When not used as a classroom, the MMC was open to anybody to use the HP2000E completely free of charge.

Over the lifetime of the MMC, more than 10,000 people benefited from learning practical computer basics in the center.

=== Night (20:00-08:00) and weekends ===
Outside working hours the access to the HP2000E computer was permitted to a small, self-selected group of enthusiasts. Many members of this group subsequently made successful careers in commercial computing.

== MMC leadership ==
Branimir Makanec was succeeded as the head of MMC by Tatjana Carev-Maruna in 1983.

== The end ==
In 1995, MMC closed down. The HP2000E computer was stored in the cellar of the School Museum in Zagreb. In 2009 HP2000E was reassembled and exhibited in the main exhibition area of the museum. In 2014 the computer was restored into almost complete working order. In 2019 it was exhibited in the School Museum as a part of the exhibition Galeb zove Orla. As part of that exhibition a permanent "Virtual Multimedia Center" was established on the WEB, where it is possible to access the simulator of the HP2000 system, as well as to find additional documentation.
