= Maddalena's cloud =

Giant molecular cloud in the constellation Monoceros

Molecular cloud
- Giant molecular cloud

Observation data: J2000 epoch
- Right ascension: 06^{h} 48^{m} 6.00^{s}
- Declination: −03° 52′ 0.0″
- Distance: ~7,860 ly
- Apparent dimensions (V): 250 x 100 pc
- Constellation: Monoceros
- Designations: Maddalena–Thaddeus cloud, G 216-02.5

Maddalena's cloud (MMC) also known as the Maddalena–Thaddeus cloud is a giant molecular cloud (GMC) of interstellar gas and dust located approximately ~7,800 ly away in the Orion–Monoceros region. The cloud was discovered in 1985 by astronomers Ronald Maddalena and Patrick Thaddeus using carbon monoxide (CO) surveys.

Maddalena's cloud is situated between the Orion arm and the Perseus arm of the Milky Way. It is notably cold, with temperatures below 10 K across most of the region. The cloud's primary velocity ranges from 15 to 38 km s⁻¹ with fragmented structures at velocities 10–12 km s⁻¹ and beyond 40 km s⁻¹, which is not associated with the Maddalena's cloud. The cloud exhibits a turbulent velocity structure identical to the active Rosette molecular cloud, even though it lacks significant active star formation. The cloud contains a mass of ~874 M_{☉} of gas above the threshold required for star formation. Despite sharing a mass similar to Orion B, the star formation rate is similar to less massive clouds like the Lupus Cloud. Research suggests the cloud may be the remnant of a past episode of star formation, existing as part of a large expanding shell and may be apart of a star forming complex that includes the adjacent H II region Sh 2-287.

The central core of the Maddalena's cloud exhibits higher velocity dispersions than the outer region and was originally considered quiescent until Megeath et al. found higher emission intensities. High column densities ranging from 3 x 10²¹–1.04 x 10²² cm⁻² exist in the central core region as well as the IRAS 06522 and IRAS 06453 molecular clouds while some peripheral regions show low column densities of 6.4 x 10¹⁹–1 x 10²¹ cm⁻², showing almost no evidence of star formation. The distance of the Maddalena's cloud is 2.41 kpc with a physical resolution of 0.6 pc.

Two satellite clouds associated with the infrared sources IRAS 06453 and IRAS 06522, these two satellite clouds are different from the Maddalena's cloud in terms of active star formation and young stellar groups. The IRAS 06522 molecular cloud features a bright and compact core while the IRAS 06453 molecular cloud exhibits high integrated intensity values similar to the rest of the Maddalena's cloud.
