= NGC 6723 =

Globular cluster in the constellation Sagittarius

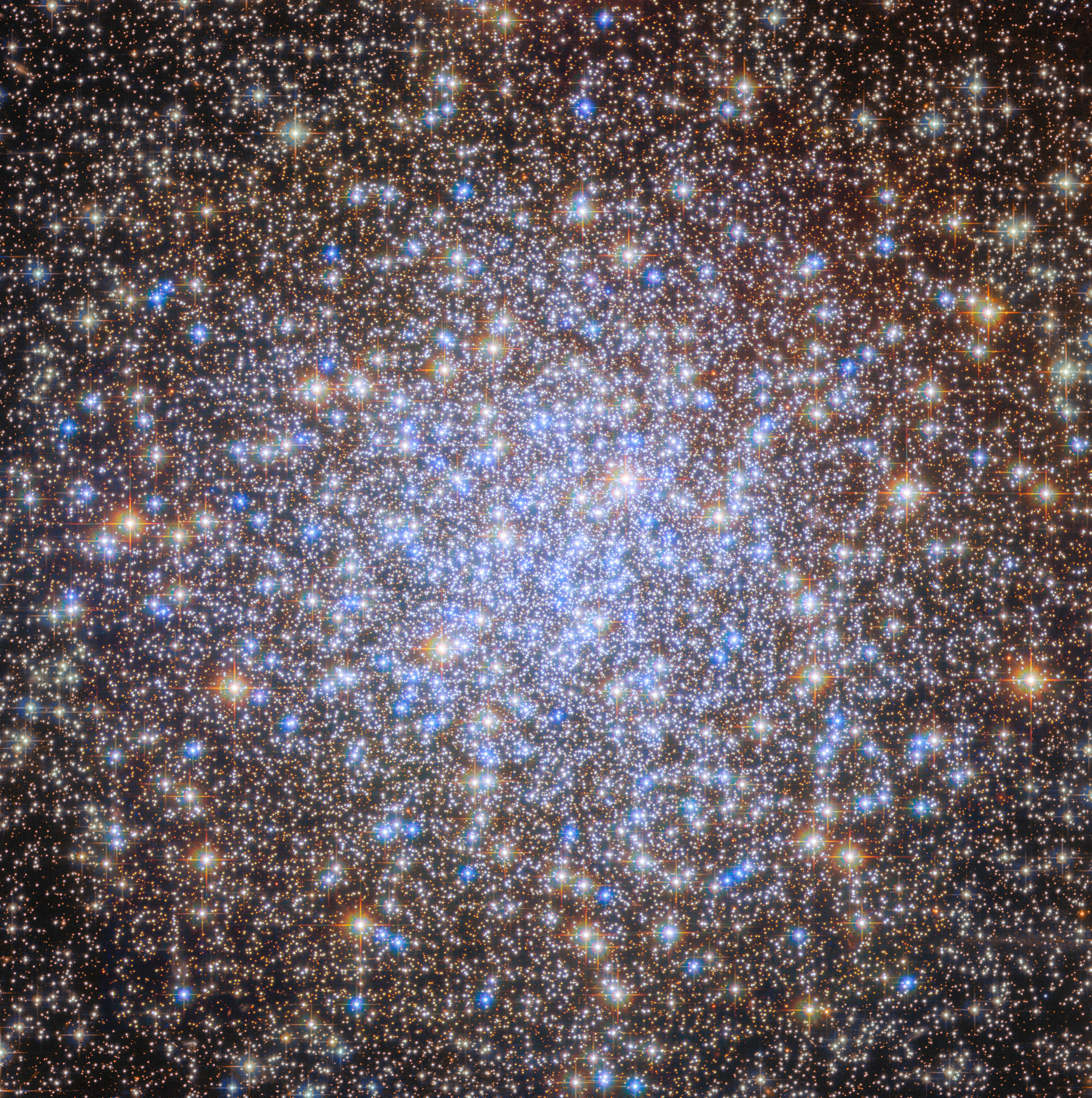
- NGC 6723 imaged by the Hubble Space Telescope

Observation data (J2000 epoch)
- Class: VII
- Constellation: Sagittarius
- Right ascension: 18^{h} 59^{m} 33.15^{s}
- Declination: –36° 37′ 56.1″
- Distance: 28.4 kly (8.7 kpc)
- Apparent magnitude (V): 6.8
- Apparent dimensions (V): 11′

Physical characteristics
- Mass: 3.57×10^{5} M_{☉}
- Metallicity: [Fe/H] = –0.96 dex
- Estimated age: 13.06 Gyr
- Other designations: Chandelier Cluster, ESO 396-SC 010, CD−36 13199, HD 175980, GCRV 11421, 2MASS J18593296-3637528

NGC 6723 (also known as the Chandelier Cluster) is a globular cluster in the constellation Sagittarius. It was discovered by British astronomer James Dunlop on 2 June 1826. Its magnitude is given as between 6 and 6.8, and its diameter is between 7 and 11 arcminutes. It is a class VII cluster with stars of magnitude 14 and dimmer. It is near the border of Sagittarius and Corona Australis.

Unlike common globular clusters, NGC 6723 has an enhanced metallicity and a large fraction of younger stars, with primordial stars accounting for only 0.363±0.017 % of the total.

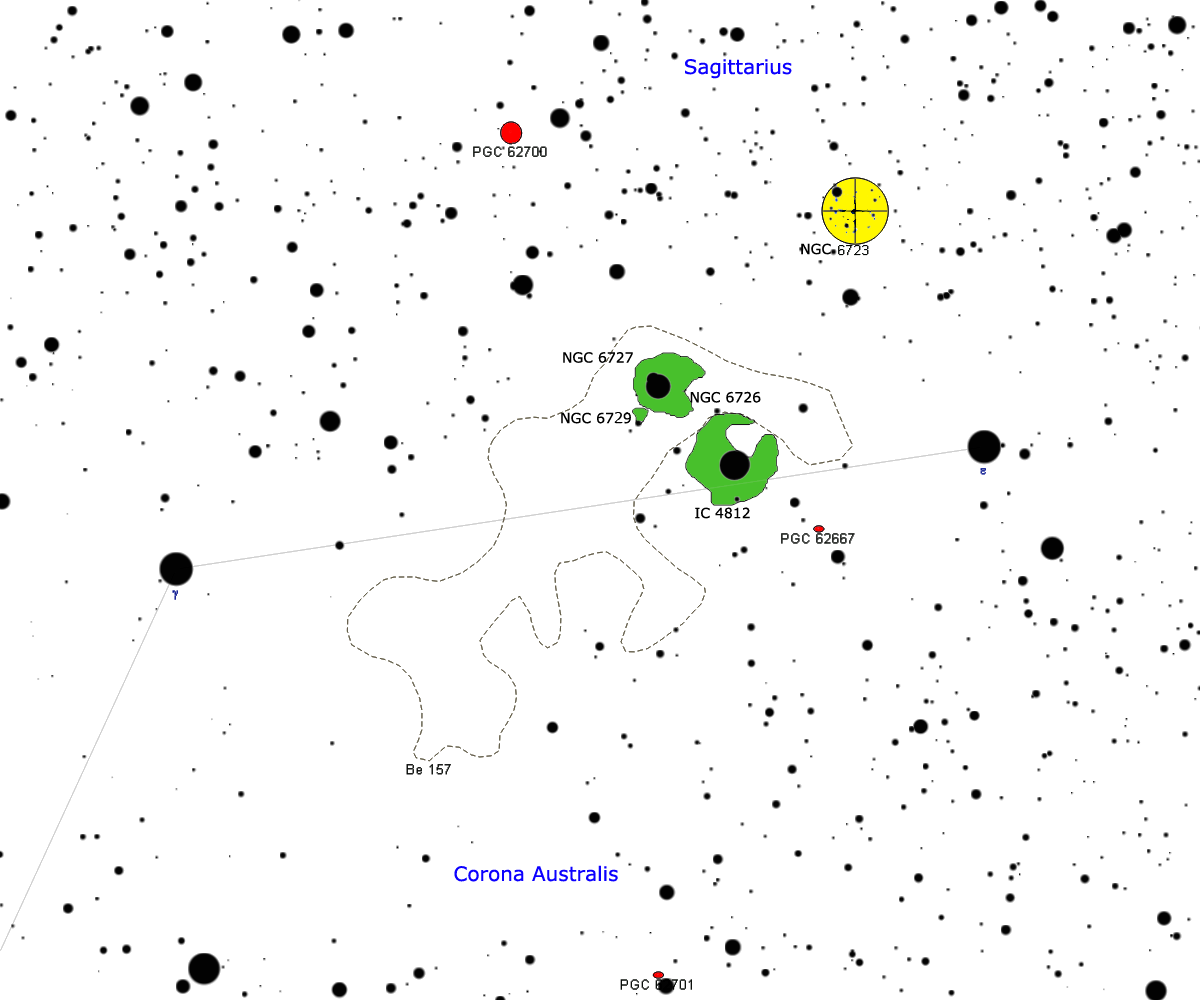
Map showing location of NGC 6723

== See also ==
- List of NGC objects (6001–7000)
