= List of stars in Orion =

This is the list of notable stars in the constellation Orion, sorted by decreasing brightness.

Name	B	F	Var	HD	HIP	RA	Dec	vis. mag.	abs. mag.	Dist. (ly)	Sp. class	Notes
Rigel	β	19		34085	24436	05^{h} 14^{m} 32.27^{s}	−08° 12′ 05.9″	0.18	−6.69	773	B8Ia + B9V + B9V	7th-brightest star, triple star system; α Cyg variable
Betelgeuse	α	58		39801	27989	05^{h} 55^{m} 10.29^{s}	+07° 24′ 25.3″	0.42	−6.02	643	M2Ib	9th-brightest star on average, semiregular variable, V_{max} = 0^{m}, V_{min} = 1.3^{m}, P = 2335 d
Bellatrix	γ	24		35468	25336	05^{h} 25^{m} 07.87^{s}	+06° 20′ 59.0″	1.64	−2.72	243	B2III	suspected variable
Alnilam	ε	46		37128	26311	05^{h} 36^{m} 12.81^{s}	−01° 12′ 06.9″	1.69	−6.38	1342	B0Ia	α Cyg variable, α Cyg variable, V_{max} = 1.64^{m}, V_{min} = 1.74^{m}
Alnitak A	ζ	50		37742	26727	05^{h} 40^{m} 45.52^{s}	−01° 56′ 33.3″	1.88	-6.0	817	O9.7Ib	component of the Alnitak system; suspected variable
Saiph	κ	53		38771	27366	05^{h} 47^{m} 45.39^{s}	−09° 40′ 10.6″	2.07	−4.65	721	B0.5Ia	suspected variable
Mintaka AB	δ	34		36486	25930	05^{h} 32^{m} 00.40^{s}	−00° 17′ 56.7″	2.20	-5.8	916	B0III+O9V	component of the Mintaka system; Algol variable, V_{max} = 2.20^{m}, V_{min} = 2.32^{m}, P = 5.73 d
ι Ori	ι	44		37043	26241	05^{h} 35^{m} 25.98^{s}	−05° 54′ 35.6″	2.75	−5.30	1325	O9III	Hatysa
π^{3} Ori	π^{3}	1		30652	22449	04^{h} 49^{m} 50.14^{s}	+06° 57′ 40.5″	3.19	-3.67	26	F6V	Tabit; suspected variable
η Ori	η	28		35411	25281	05^{h} 24^{m} 28.62^{s}	−02° 23′ 49.7″	3.35	−3.86	901	B1V + B2	Saif al Jabbar, Saiph; β Cep variable, V_{max} = 3.31^{m}, V_{min} = 3.6^{m}, P = 7.99 d
Meissa A	λ	39		36861	26207	05^{h} 35^{m} 08.28^{s}	+09° 56′ 03.0″	3.47	-4.25	1055	O8III	component of the Meissa system; suspected variable
τ Ori	τ	20		34503	24674	05^{h} 17^{m} 36.40^{s}	−06° 50′ 39.8″	3.59	−2.56	554	B5III	
π^{4} Ori	π^{4}	3		30836	22549	04^{h} 51^{m} 12.37^{s}	+05° 36′ 18.4″	3.68	−4.25	1259	B2III	variable star, ΔV = 0.003^{m}, P = 1.60 d
Alnitak B	ζ	50		37743	26727	05^{h} 40^{m} 45.60^{s}	−01° 56′ 34.0″	3.70	-3.29	817	B0III+B1IV	component of the Alnitak system
π^{5} Ori	π^{5}	8		31237	22797	04^{h} 54^{m} 15.10^{s}	+02° 26′ 26.4″	3.71	−4.36	1342	B2III	rotating ellipsoidal variable, V_{max} = 3.66^{m}, V_{min} = 3.73^{m}, P = 3.70 d
σ Ori AB	σ	48		37468	26549	05^{h} 38^{m} 44.77^{s}	−02° 36′ 00.2″	3.77	−3.96	1148	O9.5V	component of the σ Ori system; spectroscopic binary; suspected variable
ο^{2} Ori	ο^{2}	9		31421	22957	04^{h} 56^{m} 22.32^{s}	+13° 30′ 52.5″	4.06	0.48	169	K2III	
φ^{2} Ori	φ^{2}	40		37160	26366	05^{h} 36^{m} 54.33^{s}	+09° 17′ 29.1″	4.09	1.33	116	G8III-IV	
μ Ori	μ	61		40932	28614	06^{h} 02^{m} 22.99^{s}	+09° 38′ 50.5″	4.12	0.78	152	Am...	suspected eclipsing binary
29 Ori	e	29		35369	25247	05^{h} 23^{m} 56.84^{s}	−07° 48′ 28.6″	4.13	0.49	174	G8III	
32 Ori	A	32		36267	25813	05^{h} 30^{m} 47.05^{s}	+05° 56′ 53.6″	4.20	−0.53	288	B5V	
π^{2} Ori	π^{2}	2		30739	22509	04^{h} 50^{m} 36.72^{s}	+08° 54′ 00.9″	4.35	0.48	194	A1Vn	
φ^{1} Ori	φ^{1}	37		36822	26176	05^{h} 34^{m} 49.24^{s}	+09° 29′ 22.5″	4.39	−3.01	985	B0IV...	
χ^{1} Ori	χ^{1}	54		39587	27913	05^{h} 54^{m} 23.08^{s}	+20° 16′ 35.1″	4.39	4.67	28	G0V	RS CVn variable, V_{max} = 4.38^{m}, V_{min} = 4.41^{m}
ν Ori	ν	67		41753	29038	06^{h} 07^{m} 34.32^{s}	+14° 46′ 06.7″	4.42	−1.65	534	B3IV	variable star, ΔV = 0.008^{m}, P = 1.04 d
ξ Ori	ξ	70		42560	29426	06^{h} 11^{m} 56.40^{s}	+14° 12′ 31.7″	4.45	−2.00	634	B3IV	
ρ Ori	ρ	17		33856	24331	05^{h} 13^{m} 17.48^{s}	+02° 51′ 40.5″	4.46	−0.65	344	K3III...	suspected variable
π^{6} Ori	π^{6}	10		31767	23123	04^{h} 58^{m} 32.90^{s}	+01° 42′ 50.5″	4.47	−2.86	953	K2IIvar	suspected variable
ω Ori	ω	47		37490	26594	05^{h} 39^{m} 11.15^{s}	+04° 07′ 17.3″	4.50	−3.98	1622	B3IIIe	γ Cas variable, V_{max} = 4.4^{m}, V_{min} = 4.59^{m}
HD 40657				40657	28413	06^{h} 00^{m} 03.35^{s}	−03° 04′ 26.7″	4.53	−1.02	420	K2IIIvar	suspected variable
42 Ori	c	42		37018	26237	05^{h} 35^{m} 23.16^{s}	−04° 50′ 18.0″	4.58	−2.33	786	B2III...	suspected variable
ψ^{2} Ori	ψ^{2}	30		35715	25473	05^{h} 26^{m} 50.23^{s}	+03° 05′ 44.4″	4.59	−3.60	1417	B2IV	ellipsoidal variable and possible eclipsing binary, V_{max} = 4.55^{m}, V_{min} = 4.61^{m}, P = 2.53 d
υ Ori	υ	36		36512	25923	05^{h} 31^{m} 55.86^{s}	−07° 18′ 05.5″	4.62	−3.76	1545	B0V	Thabit; suspected β Cep variable
π^{1} Ori	π^{1}	7		31295	22845	04^{h} 54^{m} 53.70^{s}	+10° 09′ 04.1″	4.64	1.80	121	A0V	
χ^{2} Ori	χ^{2}	62		41117	28716	06^{h} 03^{m} 55.18^{s}	+20° 08′ 18.5″	4.64	-7.6	1801	B2Ia	α Cyg variable
11 Ori		11	V1032	32549	23607	05^{h} 04^{m} 34.14^{s}	+15° 24′ 15.1″	4.65	−0.79	400	A0p Si	α^{2} CVn variable, V_{max} = 4.65^{m}, V_{min} = 4.69^{m}, P = 4.64 d
ο^{1} Ori	ο^{1}	4		30959	22667	04^{h} 52^{m} 31.96^{s}	+14° 15′ 02.8″	4.71	−1.39	542	M3Sv	semiregular variable, V_{max} = 4.65^{m}, V_{min} = 4.88^{m}, P = 30 d
31 Ori		31	CI	36167	25737	05^{h} 29^{m} 43.98^{s}	−01° 05′ 31.8″	4.71	−1.02	456	K5III	semiregular variable, V_{max} = 4.68^{m}, V_{min} = 4.72^{m}, P = 141 d
22 Ori	o	22		35039	25044	05^{h} 21^{m} 45.75^{s}	−00° 22′ 56.9″	4.72	−3.26	1289	B2IV-V	suspected β Cep variable
56 Ori		56		39400	27750	05^{h} 52^{m} 26.44^{s}	+01° 51′ 18.6″	4.76	−2.91	1113	K2IIvar	suspected variable
49 Ori	d	49		37507	26563	05^{h} 38^{m} 53.09^{s}	−07° 12′ 45.8″	4.77	1.41	153	A4V	
HD 36960				36960	26199	05^{h} 35^{m} 02.68^{s}	−06° 00′ 07.3″	4.78	−4.00	1863	B0.5V	suspected variable
15 Ori		15		33276	24010	05^{h} 09^{m} 41.96^{s}	+15° 35′ 50.2″	4.81	−0.14	318	F2IV	
ψ^{1} Ori	ψ^{1}	25	V1086	35439	25302	05^{h} 24^{m} 44.83^{s}	+01° 50′ 47.2″	4.89	−2.77	1109	B1V:pe	γ Cas variable, V_{max} = 4.76^{m}, V_{min} = 4.96^{m}
51 Ori	b	51		37984	26885	05^{h} 42^{m} 28.66^{s}	+01° 28′ 28.8″	4.90	0.07	302	K1III	
HD 44131				44131	30093	06^{h} 19^{m} 59.60^{s}	−02° 56′ 40.2″	4.91	−1.05	506	M1III	variable star, ΔV = 0.011^{m}, P = 8.92 d
HD 37756				37756	26736	05^{h} 40^{m} 50.72^{s}	−01° 07′ 43.6″	4.95	−4.08	2090	B2IV-V	suspected eclipsing binary
69 Ori	f^{1}	69		42545	29434	06^{h} 12^{m} 03.28^{s}	+16° 07′ 49.6″	4.95	−1.93	774	B5Vn	
θ^{2} Ori A	θ^{2}	43		37041	26235	05^{h} 35^{m} 22.90^{s}	−05° 24′ 57.8″	4.98	−3.84	1895	O9.5Vpe	component of the θ^{2} Ori system; suspected variable
23 Ori	m	23		35149	25142	05^{h} 22^{m} 50.00^{s}	+03° 32′ 40.0″	5.00	−2.35	962	B1V	suspected variable
74 Ori	k	74		43386	29800	06^{h} 16^{m} 26.57^{s}	+12° 16′ 18.2″	5.04	3.58	64	F5IV-V	
27 Ori	p	27		35410	25282	05^{h} 24^{m} 28.91^{s}	−00° 53′ 30.0″	5.07	1.46	172	K0III	suspected variable
θ^{1} Ori C	θ^{1} C	41		37022	26221	05^{h} 35^{m} 16.47^{s}	−05° 23′ 22.9″	5.13	-4.9	1600	O6Vpe	component of the Trapezium; triple star system; suspected variable
64 Ori		64		41040	28691	06^{h} 03^{m} 27.36^{s}	+19° 41′ 26.2″	5.14	−2.44	1069	B8V	suspected variable
6 Ori	g	6		31283	22833	04^{h} 54^{m} 46.91^{s}	+11° 25′ 33.5″	5.18	0.84	241	A3V	suspected variable
HD 33554				33554	24197	05^{h} 11^{m} 41.56^{s}	+16° 02′ 44.4″	5.18	0.21	321	K5III	
71 Ori		71		43042	29650	06^{h} 14^{m} 50.94^{s}	+19° 09′ 24.8″	5.20	3.58	69	F6V	
60 Ori		60		40446	28296	05^{h} 58^{m} 49.58^{s}	+00° 33′ 10.7″	5.21	−0.05	367	A1Vs	suspected variable
45 Ori		45		37077	26268	05^{h} 35^{m} 39.49^{s}	−04° 51′ 21.9″	5.24	−0.04	370	F0III	
52 Ori		52		38710	27386	05^{h} 48^{m} 00.23^{s}	+06° 27′ 15.2″	5.26	−0.58	479	A5V	
38 Ori	n^{2}	38		36777	26126	05^{h} 34^{m} 16.79^{s}	+03° 46′ 01.0″	5.32	0.20	345	A2V	
5 Ori		5		31139	22730	04^{h} 53^{m} 22.76^{s}	+02° 30′ 29.8″	5.33	−1.13	638	M1III	suspected variable
HD 31296				31296	22834	04^{h} 54^{m} 47.79^{s}	+07° 46′ 45.0″	5.33	−0.33	441	K1III	
14 Ori	i	14		33054	23879	05^{h} 07^{m} 52.87^{s}	+08° 29′ 54.9″	5.33	1.46	194	Am	
21 Ori		21		34658	24817	05^{h} 19^{m} 11.23^{s}	+02° 35′ 45.4″	5.34	1.42	198	F5IIvar	
HD 36591				36591	25980	05^{h} 32^{m} 41.35^{s}	−01° 35′ 30.6″	5.34	−4.14	2567	B1IV	suspected variable
72 Ori	f^{2}	72		43153	29704	06^{h} 15^{m} 25.13^{s}	+16° 08′ 35.5″	5.34	−0.50	479	B7V	
HD 30210				30210	22157	04^{h} 46^{m} 01.70^{s}	+11° 42′ 20.2″	5.35	0.79	266	Am...	
VV Ori			VV	36695	26063	05^{h} 33^{m} 31.45^{s}	−01° 09′ 21.9″	5.36	−3.41	1852	B1V	Algol variable, V_{max} = 5.31^{m}, V_{min} = 5.66^{m}, P = 1.49 d
55 Ori		55		39291	27658	05^{h} 51^{m} 21.98^{s}	−07° 31′ 04.8″	5.36	−3.20	1680	B2IV-V	suspected variable
HD 30034				30034	22044	04^{h} 44^{m} 25.77^{s}	+11° 08′ 46.2″	5.39	1.97	157	F0V	
75 Ori	l	75		43525	29850	06^{h} 17^{m} 06.62^{s}	+09° 56′ 33.1″	5.39	0.93	254	A2V	
U Ori			U	39816	28041	05^{h} 55^{m} 49.30^{s}	+20° 10′ 30.0″	5.40		1420	M8III	Mira variable, V_{max} = 4.8^{m}, V_{min} = 13^{m}, P = 377 d
16 Ori	h	16		33254	23983	05^{h} 09^{m} 19.60^{s}	+09° 49′ 46.6″	5.43	1.77	176	A2m	suspected variable
73 Ori		73		43247	29736	06^{h} 15^{m} 44.97^{s}	+12° 33′ 03.9″	5.44	−2.72	1399	B9II-III	
33 Ori	n^{1}	33		36351	25861	05^{h} 31^{m} 14.53^{s}	+03° 17′ 31.7″	5.46	−2.95	1567	B1.5V	
HD 34043				34043	24450	05^{h} 14^{m} 44.05^{s}	+05° 09′ 22.1″	5.50	−0.82	598	K4III	suspected variable
18 Ori		18		34203	24555	05^{h} 16^{m} 04.14^{s}	+11° 20′ 28.9″	5.52	0.26	368	A0V	
HD 35536				35536	25329	05^{h} 25^{m} 01.74^{s}	−10° 19′ 43.8″	5.60	−0.85	635	K5III	
35 Ori		35		36653	26093	05^{h} 33^{m} 54.29^{s}	+14° 18′ 20.1″	5.60	−0.39	513	B3V	
HD 36881				36881	26215	05^{h} 35^{m} 13.24^{s}	+10° 14′ 24.4″	5.60	−2.66	1462	B9IIIMNp...	
Meissa B	λ	39		36862	26207	05^{h} 35^{m} 08.50^{s}	+09° 56′ 06.0″	5.61	-1.94	1055	B0.5V	component of the Meissa system
HD 43318				43318	29716	06^{h} 15^{m} 34.36^{s}	−00° 30′ 42.0″	5.62	2.86	116	F6V	
66 Ori		66		41380	28814	06^{h} 04^{m} 58.36^{s}	+04° 09′ 31.2″	5.63	−3.78	2489	G4III	
HD 36959				36959	26197	05^{h} 35^{m} 01.01^{s}	−06° 00′ 33.4″	5.67		2694	B1Vvar	suspected variable
63 Ori		63		41361	28812	06^{h} 04^{m} 58.19^{s}	+05° 25′ 11.9″	5.67	−1.97	1101	G7III:	
HD 44033				44033	30099	06^{h} 20^{m} 04.23^{s}	+14° 39′ 04.2″	5.67	−0.46	548	K3Ib	suspected variable
HD 35007				35007	25028	05^{h} 21^{m} 31.84^{s}	−00° 24′ 59.4″	5.68	−1.91	1076	B3V	
HD 35299				35299	25223	05^{h} 23^{m} 42.31^{s}	−00° 09′ 35.3″	5.69	−1.28	809	B1.5V	suspected variable
HD 40369				40369	28302	05^{h} 58^{m} 53.24^{s}	+12° 48′ 29.7″	5.70	−1.35	838	K2III...	
HD 42111				42111	29151	06^{h} 08^{m} 57.90^{s}	+02° 29′ 59.0″	5.70	−0.66	609	A3Vn	
HD 43587				43587	29860	06^{h} 17^{m} 16.25^{s}	+05° 05′ 58.9″	5.70	4.27	63	G0.5Vb	
HD 37209				37209	26345	05^{h} 36^{m} 35.69^{s}	−06° 03′ 53.1″	5.71	−3.14	1918	B1V...	suspected variable
68 Ori		68		42509	29433	06^{h} 12^{m} 01.34^{s}	+19° 47′ 26.1″	5.76	−1.61	970	B9.5V	
HD 36166				36166	25751	05^{h} 29^{m} 54.77^{s}	+01° 47′ 21.3″	5.77	−2.16	1254	B2V	
HD 34989				34989	25041	05^{h} 21^{m} 43.56^{s}	+08° 25′ 42.8″	5.78	−0.99	736	B1V...	
HD 38527				38527	27280	05^{h} 46^{m} 52.15^{s}	+09° 31′ 21.0″	5.78	0.96	300	G8III	
HD 31373				31373	22913	04^{h} 55^{m} 50.16^{s}	+15° 02′ 25.1″	5.79	0.23	423	B9V	
HD 39007				39007	27549	05^{h} 50^{m} 02.68^{s}	+09° 52′ 16.4″	5.79	0.74	334	G8III	
HD 36134				36134	25708	05^{h} 29^{m} 23.70^{s}	−03° 26′ 46.9″	5.80	0.02	467	K1III...	suspected variable
HD 43023				43023	29575	06^{h} 13^{m} 54.24^{s}	−03° 44′ 29.1″	5.83	0.91	315	G8III	
HD 42954				42954	29616	06^{h} 14^{m} 28.58^{s}	+17° 54′ 23.0″	5.86	0.15	452	A6m	
HD 37320				37320	26487	05^{h} 38^{m} 01.11^{s}	+07° 32′ 29.2″	5.87	−0.29	556	B8III	
HD 39910				39910	28011	05^{h} 55^{m} 30.16^{s}	−04° 36′ 59.4″	5.87	1.02	304	K2III:	
HD 33646				33646	24203	05^{h} 11^{m} 45.35^{s}	+01° 02′ 13.4″	5.88	−1.36	916	F5	
HD 33608				33608	24162	05^{h} 11^{m} 19.13^{s}	−02° 29′ 26.8″	5.89	2.97	125	F5V	
HD 40020				40020	28139	05^{h} 56^{m} 49.39^{s}	+11° 31′ 16.3″	5.89	1.02	307	K2III	
59 Ori		59	V1004	40372	28271	05^{h} 58^{m} 24.44^{s}	+01° 50′ 13.7″	5.89	0.72	353	A5me	δ Sct variable, V_{max} = 5.88^{m}, V_{min} = 5.92^{m}, P = 0.06 d
HD 33833				33833	24294	05^{h} 12^{m} 48.12^{s}	−06° 03′ 25.6″	5.90	0.22	446	G7III	
HD 32263				32263	23408	05^{h} 01^{m} 50.35^{s}	+00° 43′ 19.8″	5.91	−0.01	498	K0	
HD 43112				43112	29678	06^{h} 15^{m} 08.46^{s}	+13° 51′ 03.9″	5.91	−2.21	1370	B1V	suspected variable
HD 36780				36780	26108	05^{h} 34^{m} 04.06^{s}	−01° 28′ 12.7″	5.92	−1.14	842	K5III	
57 Ori		57		39698	27965	05^{h} 54^{m} 56.69^{s}	+19° 44′ 58.6″	5.92	−2.25	1405	B2V	suspected variable
HD 36162				36162	25790	05^{h} 30^{m} 26.17^{s}	+15° 21′ 38.0″	5.93	0.81	344	A3Vn	
HD 37788				37788	26762	05^{h} 41^{m} 05.59^{s}	+00° 20′ 15.7″	5.93	2.38	168	F0IV	
HD 38529				38529	27253	05^{h} 46^{m} 34.96^{s}	+01° 10′ 06.7″	5.94	2.80	138	G4V	binary star; has a planet and a brown dwarf
HD 39421				39421	27713	05^{h} 52^{m} 07.73^{s}	−09° 02′ 31.1″	5.95	0.62	379	A2Vn	
HD 37481				37481	26535	05^{h} 38^{m} 37.97^{s}	−06° 34′ 26.2″	5.96	−2.45	1567	B1.5IV	suspected variable
HD 39051				39051	27560	05^{h} 50^{m} 13.06^{s}	+04° 25′ 24.6″	5.96	0.00	507	K2III	
HD 39286				39286	27747	05^{h} 52^{m} 23.41^{s}	+19° 52′ 04.3″	5.96	−2.16	1370	B9V + G	suspected variable
HD 37171				37171	26386	05^{h} 37^{m} 04.35^{s}	+11° 02′ 06.2″	5.97	−1.04	821	K4II SB	variable star, ΔV = 0.013^{m}, P = 1.56 d
HD 38089				38089	26926	05^{h} 42^{m} 53.91^{s}	−06° 47′ 46.7″	5.97	2.47	163	F3V	
HD 38858				38858	27435	05^{h} 48^{m} 34.90^{s}	−04° 05′ 38.7″	5.97	5.01	51	G4V	has a planet; suspected variable
HD 39118				39118; 39119	27588	05^{h} 50^{m} 30.03^{s}	+02° 01′ 29.0″	5.97	−1.73	1128	G8III+...	suspected variable
HD 39885				39985	28110	05^{h} 56^{m} 28.04^{s}	+09° 30′ 33.9″	5.97	−0.68	697	A0IV	
HD 31331				31331	22840	04^{h} 54^{m} 50.71^{s}	+00° 28′ 01.8″	5.98	−1.38	964	B5V	
HD 35281				35281	25187	05^{h} 23^{m} 18.51^{s}	−08° 24′ 56.1″	5.99	0.09	493	B8+...	
HD 37594				37594	26624	05^{h} 39^{m} 31.15^{s}	−03° 33′ 53.0″	5.99	2.91	135	A8Vs	
HD 39775				39775	27939	05^{h} 54^{m} 44.04^{s}	+00° 58′ 07.0″	5.99	−1.03	827	K0III	
HD 44497				44497	30318	06^{h} 22^{m} 36.42^{s}	+12° 34′ 13.1″	6.00	2.00	205	F0III	
HD 37303				37303	26427	05^{h} 37^{m} 27.36^{s}	−05° 56′ 18.2″	6.03	−2.07	1358	B1Vvar	suspected variable
HD 30545				30545	22354	04^{h} 48^{m} 44.63^{s}	+03° 35′ 18.8″	6.04	−0.64	707	K1III	
HD 32686				32686	23643	05^{h} 04^{m} 54.53^{s}	−03° 02′ 22.8″	6.04	−3.83	3075	B5IV	
V1031 Ori			V1031	38735	27341	05^{h} 47^{m} 26.90^{s}	−10° 31′ 58.5″	6.04	−0.47	653	A4V	Algol variable, V_{max} = 6.02^{m}, V_{min} = 6.43^{m}, P = 3.41 d
HD 42477				42477	29371	06^{h} 11^{m} 27.91^{s}	+13° 38′ 19.0″	6.04	0.44	430	A0Vnn	
HD 43285				43285	29728	06^{h} 15^{m} 40.18^{s}	+06° 03′ 58.3″	6.07	−0.72	743	B6V	
HD 33883				33883	24349	05^{h} 13^{m} 31.55^{s}	+01° 58′ 03.7″	6.08	−1.07	879	A5V	
HD 38309				38309	27118	05^{h} 45^{m} 01.80^{s}	+04° 00′ 29.5″	6.09	2.57	165	F0III:n	γ Dor variable, ΔV = 0.008^{m}, P = 0.36 d
HD 41076				41076	28686	06^{h} 03^{m} 24.77^{s}	+11° 40′ 51.9″	6.09	0.25	480	A0Vs	
W Ori			W	32736	23680	05^{h} 05^{m} 23.71^{s}	+01° 10′ 39.5″	6.10	−0.56	700	C	semiregular variable, V_{max} = 5.5^{m}, V_{min} = 6.9^{m}, P = 212 d
HD 30870				30870	22597	04^{h} 51^{m} 43.38^{s}	+09° 58′ 30.3″	6.11	−0.56	704	B5V	
HD 33419				33419	24041	05^{h} 10^{m} 03.26^{s}	−00° 33′ 54.7″	6.11	1.19	314	K0III	
HD 37232				37232	26414	05^{h} 37^{m} 19.31^{s}	+08° 57′ 06.8″	6.11	−1.01	867	B2IV-V	
HD 43683				43683	29931	06^{h} 18^{m} 05.61^{s}	+14° 22′ 58.3″	6.12	−0.33	637	A3V	
HD 35317				35317	25240	05^{h} 23^{m} 51.33^{s}	−00° 51′ 59.8″	6.13	2.31	189	F7V	
HD 39632				39632	27900	05^{h} 54^{m} 13.35^{s}	+10° 35′ 11.1″	6.13	−2.15	1475	G9II	
HD 31764				31764	23161	04^{h} 58^{m} 59.41^{s}	+14° 32′ 35.7″	6.14	−0.43	671	B7V	suspected variable
13 Ori		13		33021	23852	05^{h} 07^{m} 38.32^{s}	+09° 28′ 21.8″	6.15	3.89	92	G1IV	
HD 34180				34180	24493	05^{h} 15^{m} 18.52^{s}	−01° 24′ 32.6″	6.15	2.84	150	F0IV	
HD 36558				36558	25976	05^{h} 32^{m} 37.97^{s}	+00° 00′ 43.1″	6.15	−2.16	1495	K5	
HD 37356				37356	26477	05^{h} 37^{m} 53.39^{s}	−04° 48′ 50.5″	6.16	−1.52	1120	B2IV-V	suspected variable
HD 35588				35588	25378	05^{h} 25^{m} 47.02^{s}	+00° 31′ 12.9″	6.18	−2.25	1583	B2.5V	suspected variable
HD 35693				35693	25502	05^{h} 27^{m} 13.90^{s}	+15° 15′ 27.6″	6.18	0.43	461	A1IV	
CK Ori			CK	36217	25785	05^{h} 30^{m} 19.91^{s}	+04° 12′ 17.5″	6.21	−0.02	574	K2III	not variable
HD 40347				40347	28252	05^{h} 58^{m} 11.70^{s}	−00° 59′ 38.3″	6.21	0.77	400	K0	suspected variable
HD 37744				37744	26713	05^{h} 40^{m} 37.29^{s}	−02° 49′ 30.9″	6.22	−2.34	1680	B1.5V	suspected variable
HD 40282				40282	28232	05^{h} 57^{m} 54.51^{s}	+01° 13′ 27.5″	6.22	0.21	519	M0III	
HD 36430				36430	25869	05^{h} 31^{m} 20.89^{s}	−06° 42′ 30.2″	6.23	−2.43	1762	B2V	
HD 33555				33555	24130	05^{h} 10^{m} 57.97^{s}	−02° 15′ 13.5″	6.24	2.82	158	G8III	
HD 35640				35640	25401	05^{h} 26^{m} 02.36^{s}	−05° 31′ 06.6″	6.24	−0.31	667	B9.5Vn	
HD 36779				36779	26106	05^{h} 34^{m} 03.89^{s}	−01° 02′ 08.6″	6.24	−1.66	1240	B2.5V	suspected variable
HD 37016				37016	26234	05^{h} 35^{m} 22.32^{s}	−04° 25′ 27.6″	6.24	−1.46	1128	B2.5V	
HD 38495				38495	27212	05^{h} 46^{m} 02.86^{s}	−04° 16′ 05.9″	6.24	0.96	371	K1III...	
HD 43821				43821	29982	06^{h} 18^{m} 40.35^{s}	+09° 02′ 50.2″	6.24	1.11	346	K0	
HD 31623				31623	23041	04^{h} 57^{m} 17.21^{s}	−01° 04′ 01.9″	6.25	1.63	274	F2	
HD 36840				36840	26149	05^{h} 34^{m} 29.29^{s}	−00° 00′ 44.4″	6.25	−1.63	1230	G5	
HD 39927				39927	28019	05^{h} 55^{m} 35.38^{s}	−04° 47′ 18.7″	6.28	1.32	321	A2III	
HD 30869				30869	22607	04^{h} 51^{m} 49.92^{s}	+13° 39′ 18.7″	6.30	3.19	136	F5	
HD 39685				39685	27902	05^{h} 54^{m} 15.72^{s}	+03° 13′ 32.8″	6.30	0.16	552	K0	
BL Ori			BL	44984	30564	06^{h} 25^{m} 28.18^{s}	+14° 43′ 19.2″	6.30	−1.70	1299	C	semiregular variable, V_{max} = 5.9^{m}, V_{min} = 6.6^{m}, P = 153 d
HD 32115				32115	23296	05^{h} 00^{m} 39.82^{s}	−02° 03′ 57.7″	6.31	2.83	162	A8IV	
V1197 Ori			V1197	38099	26953	05^{h} 43^{m} 09.32^{s}	−01° 36′ 47.4″	6.31	−0.28	679	K4III	rotating ellipsoidal variable, V_{max} = 6.21^{m}, V_{min} = 6.31^{m}, P = 143 d
HD 43819			V1155	43819	30019	06^{h} 19^{m} 01.85^{s}	+17° 19′ 31.0″	6.32	−0.11	631	B9IIIsp...	α^{2} CVn variable, ΔV = 0.02^{m}, P = 15.03 d
HD 30321				30321	22189	04^{h} 46^{m} 24.15^{s}	−02° 57′ 15.8″	6.33	1.68	277	A2V	
HD 33946				33946	24377	05^{h} 13^{m} 47.25^{s}	+00° 33′ 37.7″	6.33	−0.70	832	M0V	suspected variable
HD 34648				34748	24847	05^{h} 19^{m} 35.28^{s}	−01° 24′ 42.8″	6.33	−2.45	1863	B1.5Vn	
HD 35407				35407	25288	05^{h} 24^{m} 36.10^{s}	+02° 21′ 11.4″	6.33	−1.55	1226	B4IVn	
HD 36285				36285	25786	05^{h} 30^{m} 20.75^{s}	−07° 26′ 05.3″	6.33	−1.53	1216	B2IV-V	
HD 31739				31739	23092	04^{h} 58^{m} 10.90^{s}	−02° 12′ 46.0″	6.34	0.62	454	A2V	
V1649 Ori			V1649	35242	25205	05^{h} 23^{m} 31.08^{s}	+05° 19′ 23.0″	6.34	1.96	245	A2V	δ Sct variable
HD 35909				35909	25638	05^{h} 28^{m} 34.77^{s}	+13° 40′ 44.5″	6.35	1.38	322	A4V	
HD 44867				44867	30517	06^{h} 24^{m} 52.76^{s}	+16° 03′ 26.0″	6.35	0.99	385	G9III	
HD 35775				35775	25505	05^{h} 27^{m} 15.40^{s}	+02° 20′ 28.3″	6.36	0.78	425	K0	
HD 42351				42351	29326	06^{h} 11^{m} 01.77^{s}	+18° 07′ 49.7″	6.37	−3.18	2650	K1II	suspected variable
HD 43358				43358	29746	06^{h} 15^{m} 53.98^{s}	+01° 10′ 08.4″	6.37	1.53	303	F5IV:	
HD 36058				36058	25667	05^{h} 28^{m} 56.91^{s}	−03° 18′ 26.7″	6.39	−0.45	762	A0Vn	
θ^{2} Ori B	θ^{2}	43		37042		05^{h} 35^{m} 26.40^{s}	−05° 25′ 00.7″	6.38		1895	B2-B5	component of the θ^{2} Ori system; suspected variable
HD 43335				43335	29798	06^{h} 16^{m} 23.79^{s}	+17° 10′ 53.9″	6.39	−0.35	728	K5II	
HD 34880				34880	24925	05^{h} 20^{m} 26.41^{s}	−05° 22′ 03.1″	6.40	−0.19	679	B8III	
V1377 Ori			V1377	37055	26263	05^{h} 35^{m} 35.90^{s}	−03° 15′ 10.2″	6.40	−3.12	2608	B3IV	slowly pulsating B star
HD 35656				35656	25453	05^{h} 26^{m} 38.82^{s}	+06° 52′ 07.5″	6.41	1.55	305	A0Vn	
HD 35912				35912	25582	05^{h} 28^{m} 01.47^{s}	+01° 17′ 53.7″	6.41	−1.35	1160	B2V	
HD 37904				37904	26820	05^{h} 41^{m} 40.31^{s}	−02° 53′ 47.5″	6.41	1.80	273	A9IV-V	suspected variable
HD 31423				31423	22938	04^{h} 56^{m} 09.02^{s}	+07° 54′ 17.3″	6.42	2.57	192	F5	
HD 34317				34317	24607	05^{h} 16^{m} 41.05^{s}	+01° 56′ 50.4″	6.42	0.07	608	A0V	variable star, ΔV = 0.008^{m}, P = 1.75 d
HD 34878				34878	24960	05^{h} 20^{m} 43.74^{s}	+02° 32′ 41.0″	6.43	0.91	415	G8IV	
V1357 Ori			V1357	42807	29525	06^{h} 13^{m} 12.46^{s}	+10° 37′ 40.3″	6.44	5.15	59	G8V	RS CVn variable, V_{max} = 6.44^{m}, V_{min} = 6.49^{m}
HD 35575				35575	25368	05^{h} 25^{m} 36.50^{s}	−01° 29′ 28.7″	6.44	−0.49	791	B3V	
HD 32273				32273	23419	05^{h} 02^{m} 00.03^{s}	+01° 36′ 31.8″	6.45	0.49	508	B8V	suspected variable
HD 36814				36814	26104	05^{h} 34^{m} 02.48^{s}	−07° 01′ 25.1″	6.45	0.00	637	K0	
V1389 Ori			V1389	42787	29509	06^{h} 12^{m} 59.57^{s}	+06° 00′ 58.6″	6.45	−0.24	709	M...	semiregular variable
HD 37808			V1051	37808	26728	05^{h} 40^{m} 46.19^{s}	−10° 24′ 31.20″	6.46	0.38	536	B9.5IIIp Si	α^{2} CVn variable, ΔV = 0.02^{m}, P = 1.10 d
V1369 Ori			V1369	34959	25011	05^{h} 21^{m} 19.31^{s}	+04° 00′ 43.1″	6.49	−1.42	1244	B5Vp	Be star
HD 36150				36150	25732	05^{h} 29^{m} 41.59^{s}	−00° 48′ 08.7″	6.49	1.09	391	A2	variable star
HD 37635				37635	26623	05^{h} 39^{m} 30.84^{s}	−09° 42′ 23.8″	6.49	0.29	566	B7V	
HD 31411				31411	22923	04^{h} 55^{m} 58.36^{s}	+05° 23′ 56.6″	6.50	0.62	489	A0V	
HD 37150				37150	26314	05^{h} 36^{m} 15.03^{s}	−05° 38′ 52.5″	6.51		1270	B3Vv	suspected variable
HD 37017			V1046	37017	26233	05^{h} 35^{m} 21.87^{s}	−04° 29′ 39.02″	6.56		1240	B1.5V	eclipsing binary and SX Ari variable, V_{max} = 6.54^{m}, V_{min} = 6.58^{m}, P = 0.95 d
σ Ori E	σ	48	V1030	37479		05^{h} 38^{m} 47.19^{s}	−02° 35′ 40.5″	6.61		1148	B2Vp	component of the σ Ori system; prototype helium-rich star; SX Ari variable, V_{max} = 6.61^{m}, V_{min} = 6.77^{m}, P = 1.19 d
HD 43317				43317	29739	06^{h} 15^{m} 47.01^{s}	+04° 17′ 01.1″	6.62		1200	B3IV	slowly pulsating B star and β Cep variable, ΔV = 0.01^{m}, P = 0.91 d
σ Ori D	σ	48		37468		05^{h} 38^{m} 45.62^{s}	−02° 35′ 58.9″	6.62		1148	B2V	component of the σ Ori system
θ^{1} Ori D	θ^{1} D	41		37023	26224	05^{h} 35^{m} 17.20^{s}	−05° 23′ 15.7″	6.71		1600	B1.5Vp	component of the Trapezium; suspected variable
θ^{1} Ori A	θ^{1} A	41		37020	26220	05^{h} 35^{m} 15.82^{s}	−05° 23′ 14.3″	6.73		1600	B0.5V	component of the Trapezium; triple star system; Algol variable, V_{max} = 6.72^{m}, V_{min} = 7.65^{m}, P = 65.43 d
HD 35155			V1261	35155	25092	05^{h} 22^{m} 18.64^{s}	−08° 35′ 58.0″	6.77		939	S4,1	Z And and rotating ellipsoidal variable, V_{max} = 6.68^{m}, V_{min} = 7.08^{m}, P = 641 d
Mintaka C	δ	34		36485	25930	05^{h} 32^{m} 00.50^{s}	−00° 17′ 04.0″	6.83		916	B2V	component of the Mintaka system; suspected variable
HD 42618				42618	29432	06^{h} 12^{m} 01.0^{s}	+06° 46′ 59″	6.84		77	G4V	has a planet (b)
KX Ori			KX	36958		05^{h} 35^{m} 04.79^{s}	−04° 43′ 54.6″	6.90			B3V	Orion variable
Gliese 205				36395	25878	05^{h} 31^{m} 27.50^{s}	−03° 40′ 38.0″	6.97		19	M1.5V	
V901 Ori			V901	37776	26742	05^{h} 40^{m} 56.37^{s}	−01° 30′ 25.9″	6.97		1080	B2IV	SX Ari variable, V_{max} = 6.97^{m}, V_{min} = 7.02^{m}, P = 1.54 d
HD 33636				33636	24205	05^{h} 11^{m} 46.45^{s}	+04° 24′ 12.7″	7.06		92	G0VCH-0.3	binary star
HD 31253				31253	22826	04^{h} 54^{m} 44^{s}	+12° 21′ 08″	7.13		175.5	F8	has a planet (b)
S Ori			S	36090	25673	05^{h} 29^{m} 00.89^{s}	−04° 41′ 32.8″	7.20		3662	M6.5-7.5e	Mira variable, V_{max} = 7.2^{m}, V_{min} = 13.1^{m}, P = 444 d
HD 37824			V1149	37824	26795	05^{h} 41^{m} 26.79^{s}	+03° 46′ 40.9″	7.2		446	G5	RS CVn variable, ΔV = 0.11^{m}, P = 3.88 d
HD 34137				34137	24482	05^{h} 15^{m} 11.87^{s}	+01° 33′ 22.14″	7.24	−0.34	2300	K2III	
HD 37058			V359	37058		05^{h} 35^{m} 33.36^{s}	−04° 50′ 15.2″	7.30			B3Vp	SX Ari variable, V_{max} = 7.25^{m}, V_{min} = 7.36^{m}, P = 15.26 d
HD 34445				34445	24681	05^{h} 17^{m} 40.98^{s}	+07° 21′ 12.0″	7.31	3.97	152	G0	has six planets (b, c, d, e, f & g)
HD 37151			V1179	37151	26304	05^{h} 36^{m} 06.23^{s}	−07° 43′ 27.3″	7.37		627	B8V	α^{2} CVn variable, ΔV = 0.1^{m}
V1192 Ori			V1192	31993	23245	05^{h} 00^{m} 08.22^{s}	+03° 17′ 12.0″	7.50		721	K2III	RS CVn variable, V_{max} = 7.5^{m}, V_{min} = 7.57^{m}, P = 29.5 d
HD 36629				36629	26000	05^{h} 32^{m} 57.08^{s}	−04° 34′ 59.3″	7.65			B2Vv	has a subdwarf companion; suspected variable
HD 37903				37903	26816	05^{h} 41^{m} 38.39^{s}	−02° 15′ 32.5″	7.83		970	B1.5V	illuminates NGC 2023; suspected variable
HD 35298			V1156	35298	25235	05^{h} 23^{m} 50.36^{s}	+02° 04′ 55.8″	7.89		1730	B7IV	SX Ari variable, ΔV = 0.03^{m}, P = 1.85 d
HD 37806				37806	26752	05^{h} 41^{m} 02.29^{s}	−02° 43′ 00.7″	7.90		1600	A2Vpe	Orion variable, V_{max} = 7.86^{m}, V_{min} = 8.08^{m}
θ^{1} Ori B	θ^{1} B	41	BM	37021		05^{h} 35^{m} 16.10^{s}	−05° 23′ 07.0″	7.96		1600	B1V	component of the Trapezium; quintuple star system; Algol variable, V_{max} = 7.9^{m}, V_{min} = 8.65^{m}, P = 6.47 d
HD 38677				38677	27305	05^{h} 47^{m} 06.0^{s}	−10° 37′ 49″	8.0		202	F8V	has four planets (b, c, d & e)
V372 Ori			V372	36917		05^{h} 34^{m} 46.98^{s}	−05° 34′ 14.59″	8.03			A0V	Orion variable, V_{max} = 7.94^{m}, V_{min} = 8.13^{m}
HD 36668			V1107	36668	26048	05^{h} 33^{m} 26.06^{s}	+00° 37′ 16.9″	8.06		811	B8V	SX Ari variable, ΔV = 0.02^{m}, P = 2.12 d
HD 38801				38801	27384	05^{h} 47^{m} 59.18^{s}	−08° 19′ 39.7″	8.26	3.47	296	K0IV	has a planet (b)
HD 39392				39392	27828	05^{h} 53^{m} 19.0^{s}	+22° 04′ 20″	8.38		307	F8	has a planet (b)
RS Ori			RS	44415	30286	06^{h} 22^{m} 13.19^{s}	+14° 40′ 41.3″	8.42		4020	F4Ib	classical Cepheid, V_{max} = 8.01^{m}, V_{min} = 8.88^{m}, P = 7.57 d
σ Ori C	σ	48				05^{h} 38^{m} 44.12^{s}	−02° 36′ 06.3″	8.79		1148	A2V	component of the σ Ori system
HD 37605				37605	26664	05^{h} 40^{m} 01.73^{s}	+06° 03′ 38.1″	8.69	5.53	140	K0	has two planets
V351 Ori			V351	38238	27059	05^{h} 44^{m} 18.79^{s}	+00° 08′ 40.4″	8.87		547	A7IIIe	UX Ori star and δ Sct variable, V_{max} = 8.7^{m}, V_{min} = 9.8^{m}, P = 0.06 d
V2689 Ori			V2689	245409	26335	05^{h} 36^{m} 30.99^{s}	+11° 19′ 40.32″	8.90		37	K7-M0V	passed near the sun 500,000 years ago; BY Dra variable, V_{max} = 8.80^{m}, V_{min} = 9.85^{m}, P = 12.13 d
HD 290327				290327	25191	05^{h} 23^{m} 21.56^{s}	−02° 16′ 39.4″	8.96	5.26	179	G5IV	has a planet
DN Ori			DN	40632	28456	06^{h} 00^{m} 28.35^{s}	+10° 13′ 05.0″	9.15		942	A2e	Algol variable
V1355 Ori			V1355	291095		06^{h} 02^{m} 40.36^{s}	−00° 51′ 37.3″	9.19			K0-2IV	RS CVn variable, V_{max} = 8.97^{m}, V_{min} = 9.35^{m}
FT Ori			FT	42858		06^{h} 13^{m} 58.15^{s}	+21° 25′ 39.2″	9.29			A0	Algol variable, V_{max} = 9.1^{m}, V_{min} = 9.9^{m}, P = 3.15 d
ER Ori			ER		24156	05^{h} 11^{m} 14.51^{s}	−08° 33′ 24.7″	9.46		1340	G1V:	W UMa variable, V_{max} = 9.28^{m}, V_{min} = 10.01^{m}, P = 0.42 d
HD 250550			V1307	250550	28582	06^{h} 01^{m} 59.99^{s}	+16° 30′ 56.7″	9.48			B9e	Orion variable, ΔV = 0.35^{m}
UX Ori			UX	293782	23602	05^{h} 04^{m} 29.99^{s}	−03° 47′ 14.3″	9.48		913	A4IVe	prototype UX Ori star, V_{max} = 9.48^{m}, V_{min} = 12.5^{m}
EY Ori			EY	36412	25863	05^{h} 31^{m} 18.41^{s}	−05° 42′ 13.5″	9.49			A7V	Algol variable, V_{max} = 9.43^{m}, V_{min} = 10.13^{m}, P = 16.79 d
BN Ori			BN			05^{h} 36^{m} 29.35^{s}	+06° 50′ 02.2″	9.60			F4e	T Tau star, V_{max} = 9.60^{m}, V_{min} = 9.70^{m}, P = 0.65 d
FU Ori			FU			05^{h} 45^{m} 22.36^{s}	+09° 04′ 12.4″	9.60			F0Iab	prototype FU Orionis star
BF Ori			BF		26403	05^{h} 37^{m} 13.26^{s}	−06° 35′ 00.6″	9.69			A7III	UX Ori star, V_{max} = 9.69^{m}, V_{min} = 13.47^{m}
Gliese 221					27803	05^{h} 53^{m} 00.28^{s}	−05° 59′ 41.4″	9.69		66	K7V/M0V	has 2 planets
V586 Ori			V586	37258		05^{h} 36^{m} 59.25^{s}	−06° 09′ 16.4″	9.77			A3V	UX Orionis star, V_{max} = 9.48^{m}, V_{min} = 11.41^{m}
HD 37411			V1788	37411		05^{h} 38^{m} 14.51^{s}	−05° 25′ 13.3″	9.79			B9Ve	Orion variable, V_{max} = 9.76^{m}, V_{min} = 9.85^{m}
BD +03 740					23344	05^{h} 01^{m} 16.62^{s}	+04° 06′ 37.0″	9.81		371	sd:F0	metal-poor star
HD 34282			V1366	34282	24552	05^{h} 16^{m} 00.48^{s}	−09° 48′ 35.4″	9.84		622	A0	UX Ori star and δ Sct variable, V_{max} = 9.75^{m}, V_{min} = 10.62^{m}
EW Ori			EW	287727		05^{h} 20^{m} 09.15^{s}	+02° 02′ 40.0″	9.9			F8	Algol variable, V_{max} = 9.9^{m}, V_{min} = 10.6^{m}, P = 6.94 d
V1162 Ori			V1162			05^{h} 32^{m} 01.99^{s}	−07° 15′ 24.6″	9.9			A6mF2	δ Sct variable
Z Ori			Z	249313	28045	05^{h} 55^{m} 50.93^{s}	+13° 41′ 42.0″	9.98			B4V...	Algol variable
GW Ori			GW	244138	25689	05^{h} 29^{m} 08.39^{s}	+11° 52′ 12.7″	10.10		896	G5/8Ve	triple star; T Tau star
WASP-82						04^{h} 50^{m} 39.0^{s}	+01° 53′ 38″	10.1		652	F5	has a transiting planet (b)
V1005 Ori			V1005		23200	04^{h} 59^{m} 34.83^{s}	+01° 47′ 00.7″	10.11		84	M0Ve	T Tau star and flare star, ΔV = 0.067^{m}, P = 4.41 d
V346 Ori			V346	287841	25299	05^{h} 24^{m} 42.80^{s}	+01° 43′ 48.3″	10.17		1570	A	UX Ori star and δ Sct variable, V_{max} = 10.1^{m}, V_{min} = 10.9^{m}, P = 0.03 d
CO Ori			CO		25540	05^{h} 27^{m} 38.34^{s}	+11° 25′ 39.0″	10.30		1060	F7Ve	UX Ori star, V_{max} = 10.0^{m}, V_{min} = 12.8^{m}
FZ Ori			FZ	288166		05^{h} 41^{m} 21.01^{s}	+02° 36′ 23.0″	10.70			G0	W UMa variable, V_{max} = 10.7^{m}, V_{min} = 11.3^{m}, P = 0.40 d
V380 Ori			V380		26327	05^{h} 36^{m} 25.43^{s}	−06° 52′ 57.7″	10.7			A1e	quadruple star; UX Ori star
GG Ori			GG	290842		05^{h} 43^{m} 10.22^{s}	−00° 41′ 14.9″				A2	Algol variable
HK Ori			HK			05^{h} 31^{m} 28.05^{s}	+12° 09′ 10.3″	11.20			A2?e+G0?e	UX Ori star, V_{max} = 11.2^{m}, V_{min} = 12.3^{m}
T Ori			T			05^{h} 35^{m} 50.44^{s}	−05° 28′ 34.9″	11.25			A3IVeb	UX Ori star, V_{max} = 9.5^{m}, V_{min} = 12.6^{m}
DY Ori			DY			06^{h} 06^{m} 14.91^{s}	+13° 54′ 19.1″	11.29				RV Tau variable, V_{max} = 11.2^{m}, V_{min} = 12.2^{m}, P = 60.84 d
LkHα 208						06^{h} 07^{m} 49.54^{s}	+18° 39′ 26.5″	11.30		1000	F0Ve	associated with a bipolar nebula
GJ 3379						06^{h} 00^{m} 03.50^{s}	+02° 42′ 23.7″	11.31		17	M4.0V	
FH Ori			FH	243229		05^{h} 23^{m} 18.62^{s}	+04° 15′ 38.2″	11.37			A2	Algol variable
θ^{1} Ori E	θ^{1} E	41				05^{h} 35^{m} 15.77^{s}	−05° 23′ 10.02″	11.4		1600	G2IV+G2IV	component of the Trapezium; Algol variable and T Tau star, ΔV = 0.1^{m}, P = 9.90 d
V371 Ori			V371		26081	05^{h} 33^{m} 44.81^{s}	+01° 56′ 43.4″	11.50		51	M2.5V	Wachmann's Flare Star; flare star
Ross 87			V1352		26857	05^{h} 42^{m} 09.27^{s}	+12° 29′ 21.6″	11.51		19	M4.0V	BY Dra variable, V_{max} = 11.48^{m}, V_{min} = 11.55^{m}
Gliese 179					22627	04^{h} 52^{m} 05.73^{s}	+06° 28′ 35.5″	11.96	7.41	40	M3.5	has a planet
GP Ori			GP	286340		05^{h} 02^{m} 48.07^{s}	+15° 19′ 12.6″	12.20			SC7/8	semiregular variable
RX J0529.4+0041			V1642			05^{h} 29^{m} 20.65^{s}	+00° 41′ 28.0″	12.30			K2	Algol variable, V_{max} = 12.03^{m}, V_{min} = 13.07^{m}, P = 3.04 d
GU Ori			GU			06^{h} 10^{m} 04.62^{s}	+12° 49′ 46.6″					W UMa variable, V_{max} = 12.5^{m}, V_{min} = 13.3^{m}, P = 0.47 d
YY Ori			YY			05^{h} 34^{m} 47.53^{s}	−05° 57′ 56.9″	13.20			K2IVe	prototype YY Orionis star
LV 2	θ^{1} G	41				05^{h} 35^{m} 16.72^{s}	−05° 23′ 16.6″	13.68		1600	K0.7	component of the Trapezium; has a protoplanetary disk
G 99-47			V1201			05^{h} 56^{m} 25.47^{s}	+05° 21′ 48.6″	14.10		26	DA8P	variable white dwarf, V_{max} = 13^{m}, V_{min} = 14.12^{m}
V1118 Ori			V1118			05^{h} 34^{m} 44.75^{s}	−05° 33′ 42.2″	14.43			M1e	EXor
LP 658-2						05^{h} 55^{m} 09.49^{s}	−04° 10′ 04.3″	14.45		21	DZ11	
G 99-37						05^{h} 51^{m} 19.48^{s}	−00° 10′ 21.3″	14.60		36	DQ8P	strongly magnetized white dwarf
V1159 Ori			V1159			05^{h} 28^{m} 59.57^{s}	−03° 33′ 52.3″					ER UMa variable
VY Ori			VY			05^{h} 33^{m} 35.89^{s}	−05° 01′ 32.49″	14.9				variable star
V1309 Ori			V1309			05^{h} 15^{m} 41.41^{s}	+01° 04′ 40.5″	15.2			WD+M0V	polar, V_{max} = 15.2^{m}, V_{min} = 18.2^{m}
CN Ori			CN			05^{h} 52^{m} 07.79^{s}	−05° 25′ 00.5″	16.2				SS Cyg variable, V_{max} = 12.1^{m}, V_{min} = 16.2^{m}
CZ Ori			CZ			06^{h} 16^{m} 43.23^{s}	+15° 24′ 11.3″	17.6				SS Cygni variable, V_{max} = 12.1^{m}, V_{min} = 17.6^{m}
V1647 Ori			V1647			05^{h} 46^{m} 13.14^{s}	−00° 06′ 04.8″	18.1				EXor, V_{max} = 18.1^{m}, V_{min} = <20^{m}
4U 0614+091			V1055			06^{h} 17^{m} 07.3^{s}	+09° 08′ 13″	18.5				low-mass X-ray binary; producing relativistic jets
Becklin–Neugebauer Object			V2254			05^{h} 35^{m} 14.11^{s}	−05° 22′ 22.7″				B	Orion variable; well-studied protostar
2MASS J05352184-0546085			V2384			05^{h} 35^{m} 21.84^{s}	−05° 46′ 08.6″				M7	eclipsing binary brown dwarf
OMC-2 FIR 4			V2457			05^{h} 35^{m} 26.97^{s}	−05° 09′ 54.5″				M7	has a circumstellar disk; Orion variable
Orion Source I						05^{h} 35^{m} 14.51^{s}	−05° 22′ 30.4″					protostellar binary
Reipurth 50						05^{h} 40^{m} 27.45^{s}	−07° 27′ 30.1″					suspected FU Ori star
S Ori 70						05^{h} 38^{m} 10.10^{s}	−02° 26′ 26.0″				T6	possibly a rogue planet
WISE J0521+1025						05^{h} 21^{m} 26.30^{s}	+10° 25′ 28.5″	16				brown dwarf
Table legend: • Name = Proper name • B = Bayer designation • F or/and G. = Flamsteed designation or Gould designation • Var = Variable-star designation • HD = Henry Draper Catalogue designation number • HIP = Hipparcos Catalogue designation number • RA = Right ascension for the Epoch/Equinox J2000.0 • Dec = Declination for the Epoch/Equinox J2000.0 • vis. mag. = visual magnitude (m or m_{v}), also known as apparent magnitude • abs. mag. = absolute magnitude (M_{v}) • Dist. (ly) = Distance in light-years from Earth • Sp. class = Spectral class of the star in the stellar classification system • Notes = Common name(s) or alternate name(s); comments; notable properties [for example: multiple star status, range of variability if it is a variable star, exoplanets, etc.]

== See also ==
- List of stars by constellation
