= HD 44131 =

Star in the constellation Orion

- Location of HD 44131 (circled)

Observation data Epoch J2000 Equinox ICRS
- Constellation: Orion
- Right ascension: 06^{h} 19^{m} 59.60059^{s}
- Declination: −02° 56′ 40.1765″
- Apparent magnitude (V): 4.91

Characteristics
- Evolutionary stage: AGB
- Spectral type: M1III
- U−B color index: +1.96
- B−V color index: +1.60

Astrometry
Radial velocity (R_{v})	+48.60 km/s
Proper motion (μ)	RA: −6.42 mas/yr Dec.: −1.26 mas/yr
Parallax (π)	7.02±0.23 mas
Distance	460 ± 20 ly (142 ± 5 pc)
Absolute magnitude (M_{V})	−0.86

Details
Radius	55.89+4.05 −4.54 R_{☉}
Luminosity	673±26 L_{☉}
Temperature	3,932+170 −135 K

Other designations
- NSV 2918, BD−02°1564, GC 8137, HD 44131, HIP 30093, HR 2275, SAO 133118

Database references
SIMBAD	data

HD 44131 is a star in the equatorial constellation of Orion, positioned near the eastern constellation border with Monoceros. It has a reddish hue and is faintly visible to the naked eye with an apparent visual magnitude of 4.91. The star is located at a distance of approximately 465 light years from the Sun based on parallax, and it is drifting further away with a radial velocity of +48.6 km/s. Based on radial velocity variations, it is a candidate spectroscopic binary system and a preliminary orbital solution was published in 1991 with a period of 9.29 yr. However, these velocity variations may be due to other causes.

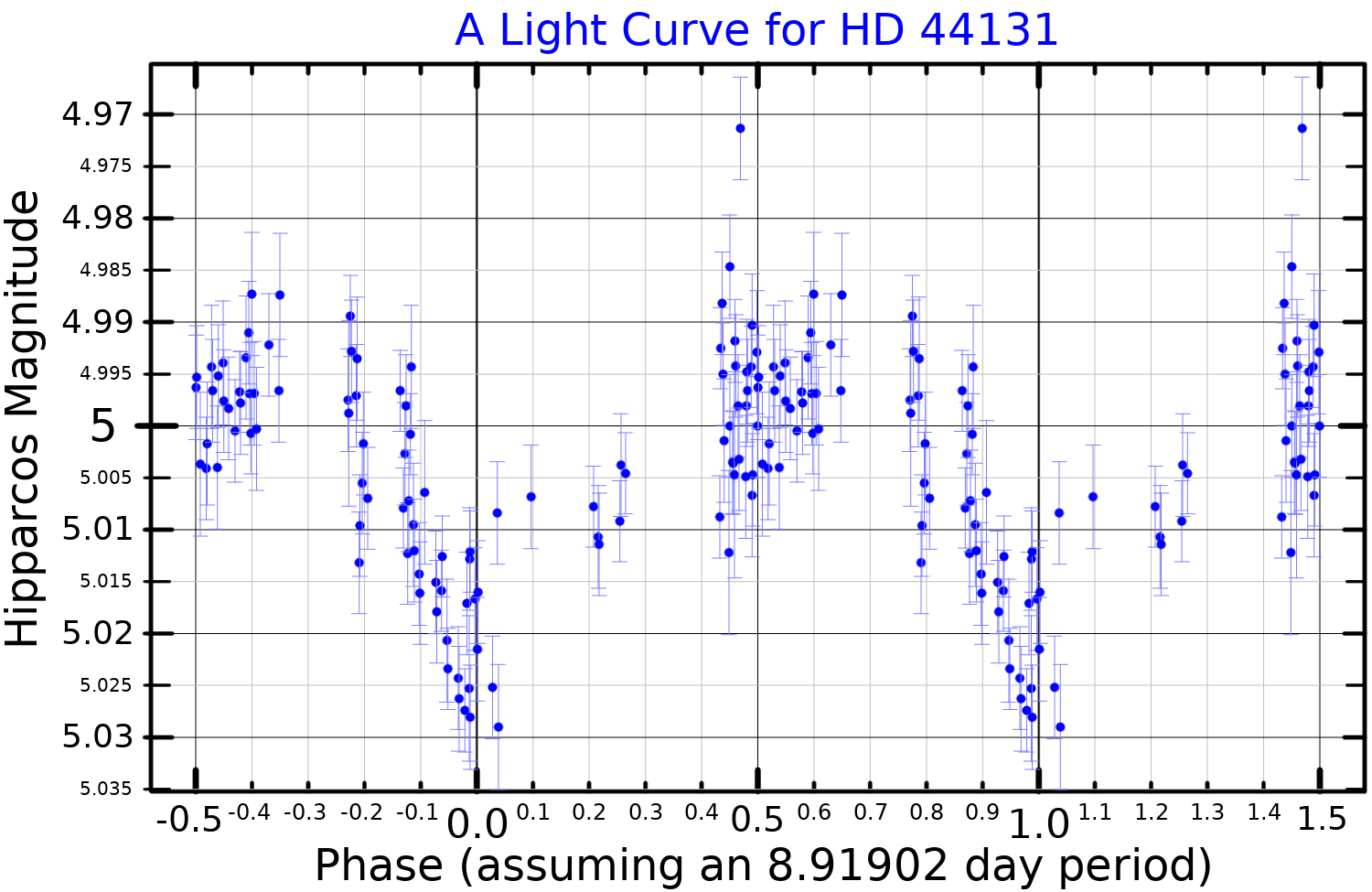
A light curve for HD 44131, plotted from Hipparcos data

This is an aging red giant star currently on the asymptotic giant branch with a stellar classification of M1III. With the supply of core hydrogen exhausted, this star has cooled and expanded off the main sequence. It is now estimated to have 56 times the radius of the Sun and is radiating 673 times the Sun's luminosity from its swollen photosphere at an effective temperature of 3,932 K. This is a periodic variable of unknown type with a frequency of 0.11212 cycles per day (period of 8.9 days) and an amplitude of 0.0106 in magnitude.
