= HD 40657 =

Star in the constellation Orion

- Location of HD 40657 (circled)

Observation data Epoch J2000 Equinox ICRS
- Constellation: Orion
- Right ascension: 06^{h} 00^{m} 03.34963^{s}
- Declination: −03° 04′ 27.3305″
- Apparent magnitude (V): 4.52

Characteristics
- Evolutionary stage: red giant branch
- Spectral type: K1.5III-IIIb CN-1
- U−B color index: +1.21
- B−V color index: +1.22
- Variable type: suspected

Astrometry
Radial velocity (R_{v})	+25.9±0.9 km/s
Proper motion (μ)	RA: +10.754 mas/yr Dec.: −73.601 mas/yr
Parallax (π)	9.7817±0.2473 mas
Distance	333 ± 8 ly (102 ± 3 pc)
Absolute magnitude (M_{V})	−1.00

Details
Mass	1.68 M_{☉}
Radius	22.2 R_{☉}
Luminosity	171 L_{☉}
Surface gravity (log g)	2.42 cgs
Temperature	4,435 K
Metallicity [Fe/H]	−0.48 dex
Rotational velocity (v sin i)	2.1 km/s
Age	2.27 Gyr

Other designations
- NSV 2770, BD−03°1256, FK5 2457, GC 7587, HD 40657, HIP 28413, HR 2113, SAO 132732

Database references
SIMBAD	data

HD 40657 is a single star in the equatorial constellation of Orion, near the constellation border with Monoceros. It has an orange hue and is faintly visible to the naked eye with an apparent visual magnitude of 4.52. The star is located at a distance of approximately 333 light years from the Sun based on parallax. It is drifting further away with a radial velocity of +26 km/s.

This is an aging giant star with a stellar classification of K1.5III-IIIb CN-1, where the suffix notation indicates an underabundance of cyanogen in the spectrum. Having exhausted the supply of hydrogen at its core, this star cooled and expanded off the main sequence. At present it has 22 times the radius of the Sun.

HD 40657 is a suspected variable star with a brightness that has been measured ranging from magnitude 4.54 down to 4.58. It is an estimated 2.27 billion years old with 1.68 times the mass of the Sun and is spinning with a projected rotational velocity of 2.1 km/s. The star is radiating 171 times the Sun's luminosity from its swollen photosphere at an effective temperature of 4,536 K.
