= 56 Orionis =

In the constellation Orion

- Location of 56 Orionis (circled)

Observation data Epoch J2000 Equinox ICRS
- Constellation: Orion
- Right ascension: 05^{h} 52^{m} 26.43865^{s}
- Declination: +01° 51′ 18.5021″
- Apparent magnitude (V): 4.76 (4.73 to 4.78)

Characteristics
- Spectral type: K2-IIb
- U−B color index: +1.46
- B−V color index: +1.382±0.005

Astrometry
Radial velocity (R_{v})	+11.27±0.14 km/s
Proper motion (μ)	RA: –6.942 mas/yr Dec.: –8.355 mas/yr
Parallax (π)	2.8794±0.1854 mas
Distance	1,130 ± 70 ly (350 ± 20 pc)
Absolute magnitude (M_{V})	−3.14

Details
Mass	6.4±0.7 M_{☉}
Radius	92.21+4.27 −6.72 R_{☉}
Luminosity	2,547±187 L_{☉}
Surface gravity (log g)	0.91 cgs
Temperature	4,270+165 −96 K
Metallicity [Fe/H]	−0.07 dex
Rotational velocity (v sin i)	3.5 km/s
Age	60.7±18.4 Myr

Other designations
- 56 Ori, NSV 2690, BD+01°1151, FK5 2444, GC 7380, HD 39400, HIP 27750, HR 2037, SAO 113220, CCDM J05524+0151, WDS 05524+0151

Database references
SIMBAD	data

56 Orionis is a single, variable star in the equatorial constellation of Orion. It has an orange hue and is faintly visible to the naked eye with an apparent visual magnitude that fluctuates around 4.76. The star is located at a distance of approximately 1,130 light years from the Sun based on parallax. It is drifting further away with a radial velocity of +11 km/s. The star has a peculiar velocity of 19.0+2.9
−3.1 km/s relative to its neighbors, and may be a runaway star.

This object is a bright giant star with a stellar classification of K2-IIb. It is a suspected variable star of unknown type with a brightness that has been measured varying from 4.73 down to 4.78. The star is about 61 million years old with 6.4 times the mass of the Sun and is spinning with a projected rotational velocity of 3.5. Having exhausted the supply of hydrogen at its core, the star has expanded to 92 times the radius of the Sun. It is radiating 2,547 times the Sun's luminosity from its enlarged photosphere at an effective temperature of 4,270 K.

It has one reported visual companion, designated component B, with magnitude 13.5 and angular separation 42.9″.
