= HD 37756 =

Binary star system in the constellation Orion

- Location of HD 37756 (circled)

Observation data Epoch J2000 Equinox ICRS
- Constellation: Orion
- Right ascension: 05^{h} 40^{m} 50.71498^{s}
- Declination: −01° 07′ 43.6366″
- Apparent magnitude (V): 4.95

Characteristics

primary
- Spectral type: B2IV-V or B3V
- U−B color index: −0.83
- B−V color index: −0.21

secondary
- Spectral type: B1

Astrometry
Radial velocity (R_{v})	+26.10 km/s
Proper motion (μ)	RA: −1.50 mas/yr Dec.: −0.84 mas/yr
Parallax (π)	3.63±0.37 mas
Distance	approx. 900 ly (approx. 280 pc)
Absolute magnitude (M_{V})	−2.74

Orbit
Period (P)	27.154925 d
Eccentricity (e)	0.739±0.007
Periastron epoch (T)	2,447,886.076±0.065 HJD
Argument of periastron (ω) (secondary)	81.4±2.4°
Semi-amplitude (K_{1}) (primary)	84.7±1.1 km/s

Details

A
Mass	13.0 M_{☉}

B
Mass	8.3 M_{☉}

Other designations
- NSV 2556, BD−01°1004, GC 7091, HD 37756, HIP 26736, HR 1952, SAO 132445

Database references
SIMBAD	data

HD 37756, due north of Alnitak, the bright star at the centre of the frame, and due east (left) of Alnilam, the bright star on the right

HD 37756 is a binary star system in the equatorial constellation of Orion, positioned less than a degree to the north of the bright star Alnitak. It has a blue-white hue and is faintly visible to the naked eye with an apparent visual magnitude of 4.95. The system is located at a distance of approximately 900 light-years from the Sun based on parallax, and is drifting further away with a radial velocity of +26 km/s. It is a member of the OB1b subgroup of the Orion OB1 association.

The binary nature of this system was identified by E. B. Frost in 1906. It is a double-lined spectroscopic binary with an orbital period of 27.15 days and a high eccentricity of 0.74. The spectrum matches a massive B-type main-sequence star with a stellar classification of B3V. The secondary is luminous enough to interfere with measurements of the primary spectrum. It is a suspected Beta Cephei variable with a period of 0.37968 days and an amplitude of 0.03 magnitude in the B band of the UBV photometric system. The system is a candidate eclipsing binary with a minimum dip of 0.04 in visual magnitude during each orbit.
