= 22 Orionis =

Binary star system in the constellation Orion

- Location of 22 Orionis (circled)

Observation data Epoch J2000 Equinox ICRS
- Constellation: Orion
- Right ascension: 05^{h} 21^{m} 45.74861^{s}
- Declination: −00° 22′ 56.9105″
- Apparent magnitude (V): 4.74

Characteristics
- Spectral type: B2 IV-V
- U−B color index: −0.79
- B−V color index: −0.16

Astrometry
Radial velocity (R_{v})	+28.80 km/s
Proper motion (μ)	RA: −1.320 mas/yr Dec.: +3.457 mas/yr
Parallax (π)	2.8672±0.3512 mas
Distance	approx. 1,100 ly (approx. 350 pc)
Absolute magnitude (M_{V})	−2.98

Orbit
Period (P)	293 days
Eccentricity (e)	0.15
Periastron epoch (T)	2,442,175 JD
Argument of periastron (ω) (secondary)	234°
Semi-amplitude (K_{1}) (primary)	4.1 km/s

Details

22 Ori A
Mass	9.5 M_{☉}
Radius	6.6 R_{☉}
Luminosity	7,244 L_{☉}
Surface gravity (log g)	3.56 cgs
Temperature	22,646 K
Metallicity [Fe/H]	−0.06 dex
Rotation	9.35 days
Rotational velocity (v sin i)	9 km/s
Age	18.5 Myr

Other designations
- o Orionis, 22 Ori, NSV 16291, BD−00°930, FK5 1147, GC 6579, HD 35039, HIP 25044, HR 1765, SAO 132028

Database references
SIMBAD	data

22 Orionis is a binary star in the equatorial constellation of Orion. It has the Bayer designation o Orionis, while 22 Orionis is the Flamsteed designation. This system is visible to the naked eye as a faint, blue-white hued star with an apparent visual magnitude of 4.74. It is located approximately 1,100 light years away from the Sun based on parallax. The system is moving further from the Earth with a heliocentric radial velocity of +28.80

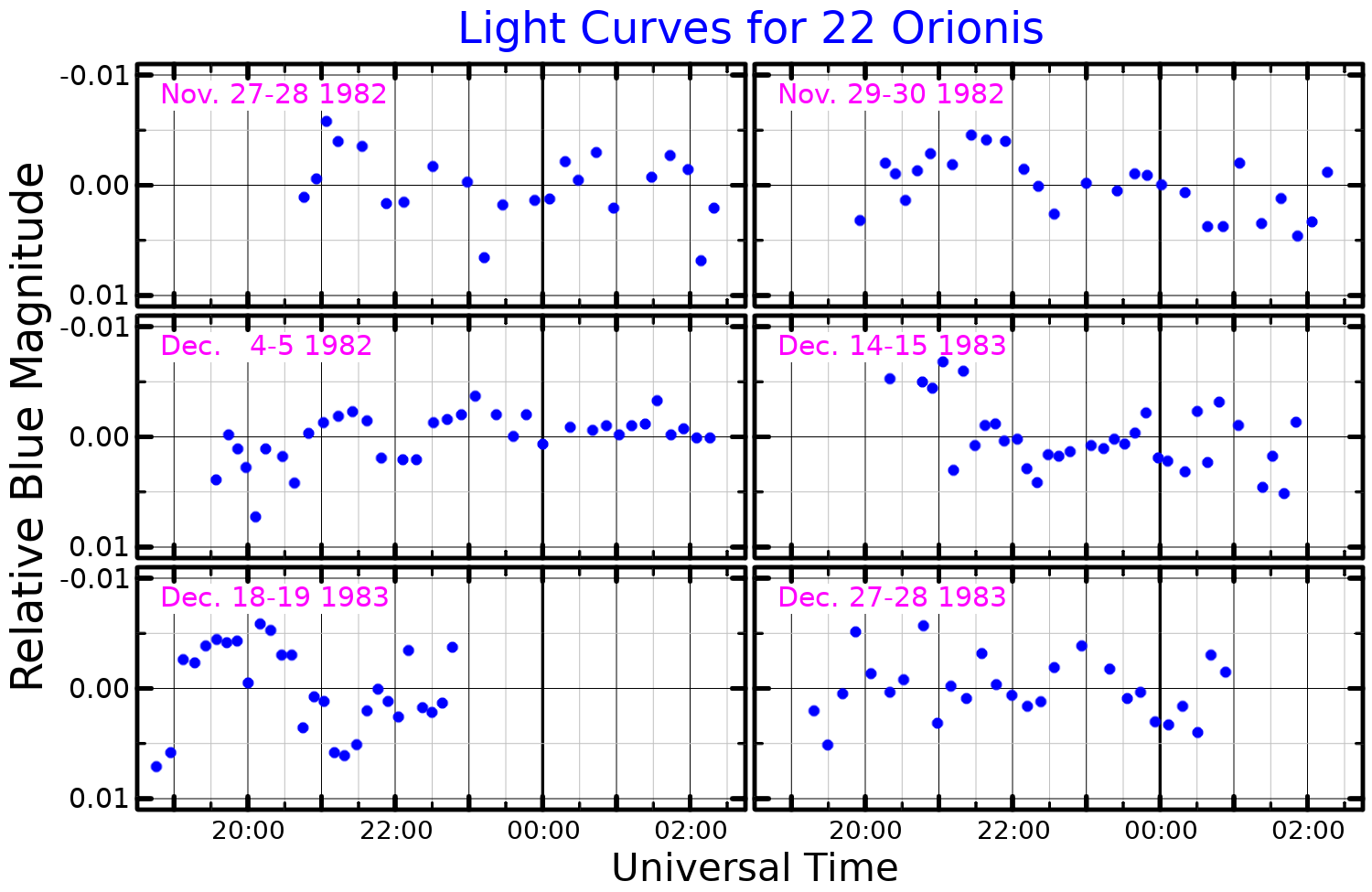
A light curves for 22 Orionis, adapted from Balona and Engelbrecht (1985)

This is a single-lined spectroscopic binary with an orbital period of 293 days and an eccentricity of 0.15. The visible member, component A, has a stellar classification of B2 IV-V, matching a B-type star with a luminosity class that displays mixed traits of a main sequence star and a subgiant. It is a suspected Beta Cephei variable or a slowly pulsating B star. The star has about nine times the mass of the Sun and is radiating 7,244 times the Sun's luminosity from its photosphere at an effective temperature of 22,646 K.
