= Psi2 Orionis =

Spectroscopic binary system in the constellation of Orion

ψ^{2} Orionis
- Location of ψ^{2} Orionis (circled in red)

Observation data Epoch J2000.0 Equinox J2000.0 (ICRS)
- Constellation: Orion
- Right ascension: 05^{h} 26^{m} 50.22932^{s}
- Declination: +03° 05′ 44.4222″
- Apparent magnitude (V): 4.55 (- 4.58) - 4.61

Characteristics
- Spectral type: B2 IV (B1 III + B2 V)
- U−B color index: −0.94
- B−V color index: −0.22
- Variable type: Eclipsing

Astrometry
Radial velocity (R_{v})	−11.8±0.1 km/s
Proper motion (μ)	RA: +1.448 mas/yr Dec.: −1.019 mas/yr
Parallax (π)	2.9943±0.1533 mas
Distance	1,140±13 ly (351±4 pc)
Absolute magnitude (M_{V})	−2.71

Orbit
Period (P)	2.525940(2) days
Semi-major axis (a)	24 R_{☉} (Note: from a sin i / sin(i), with a sin i = 21.9 R_{☉} and i = 65.9°.)
Eccentricity (e)	0.0467±0.0003
Inclination (i)	65.9±0.1°
Periastron epoch (T)	58469.9122(1) BJD
Argument of periastron (ω) (primary)	340.7±0.3°
Semi-amplitude (K_{1}) (primary)	174.3±0.1 km/s
Semi-amplitude (K_{2}) (secondary)	265.6±0.3 km/s

Details

ψ^{2} Ori A
Mass	17.69±0.05 M_{☉}
Radius	5.27±0.02 R_{☉}
Luminosity	3,890 L_{☉}
Surface gravity (log g)	4.06±0.03 cgs
Temperature	25,600±610 K
Metallicity	$\begin{smallmatrix}\left[\ce{M}/\ce{H}\right]\end{smallmatrix}$ = −0.172±0.038
Rotational velocity (v sin i)	102±3 km/s
Age	11.4±1.9 Myr

ψ^{2} Ori B
Mass	11.61±0.05 M_{☉}
Radius	5.05±0.02 R_{☉}
Luminosity	10,000 L_{☉}
Surface gravity (log g)	4.28±0.04 cgs
Temperature	21,000±630 K
Metallicity	$\begin{smallmatrix}\left[\ce{M}/\ce{H}\right]\end{smallmatrix}$ = −0.172±0.038
Rotational velocity (v sin i)	77±4 km/s
Age	11.4±1.9 Myr

Other designations
- ψ^{2} Ori, 30 Orionis, BD+02°962, HD 35715, HIP 25473, HR 1811, SAO 112775.

Database references
SIMBAD	data

Psi^{2} Orionis a binary star system in the equatorial constellation of Orion. It has an apparent visual magnitude of 4.6, indicating that it is visible to the naked eye. It is roughly 1,140 light years distant from the Sun.

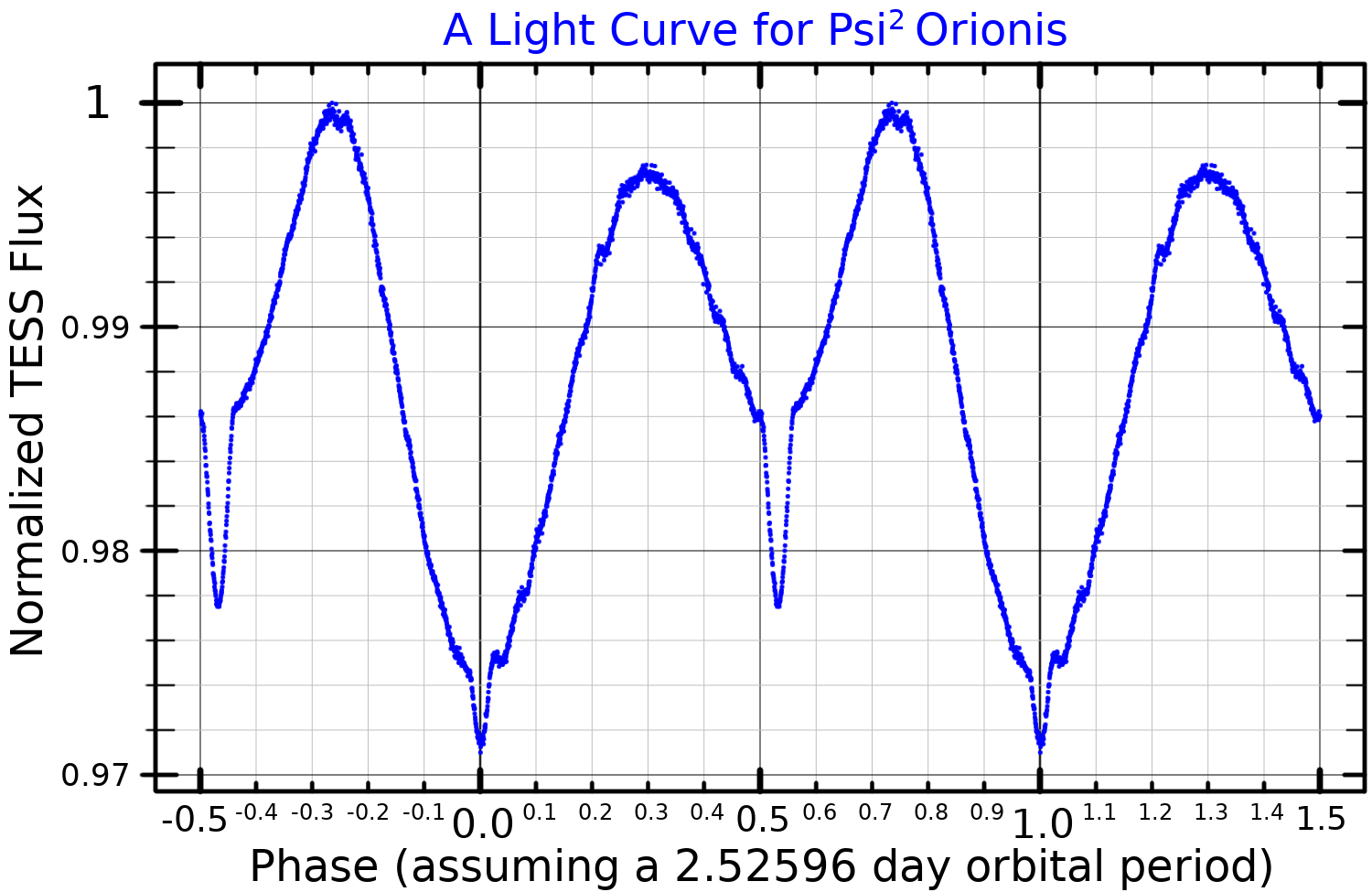
A light curve for Psi^{2} Orionis plotted from TESS data

This is a double-lined spectroscopic binary, which means that the individual absorption lines of both components can be discerned. The pair orbit each other with a period of 2.526 days and a low eccentricity of 0.0467. The close orbit is causing their mutual gravitational interaction to distort the shapes of the stars, turning this system into an ellipsoidal variable. The inclination of orbital plane is sufficiently low that the two stars form a grazing eclipsing binary. During the eclipse of the primary component, the visual magnitude is reduced by 0.06, whereas the secondary eclipse reduces the magnitude by 0.03. The brightness variability has led to the star being classified as a pulsating Beta Cephei variable, but no evidence has been found of pulsations superimposed on the variability due to ellipsoidal rotations and eclipses.

The combined spectrum of Psi^{2} Orionis matches that of a B-type subgiant star with a stellar classification of B2 IV. The primary component is an evolved giant star with a class of B1 III, while the secondary is a B-type main sequence star with a classification of B2 V.
