= BF Orionis =

Young protostar system

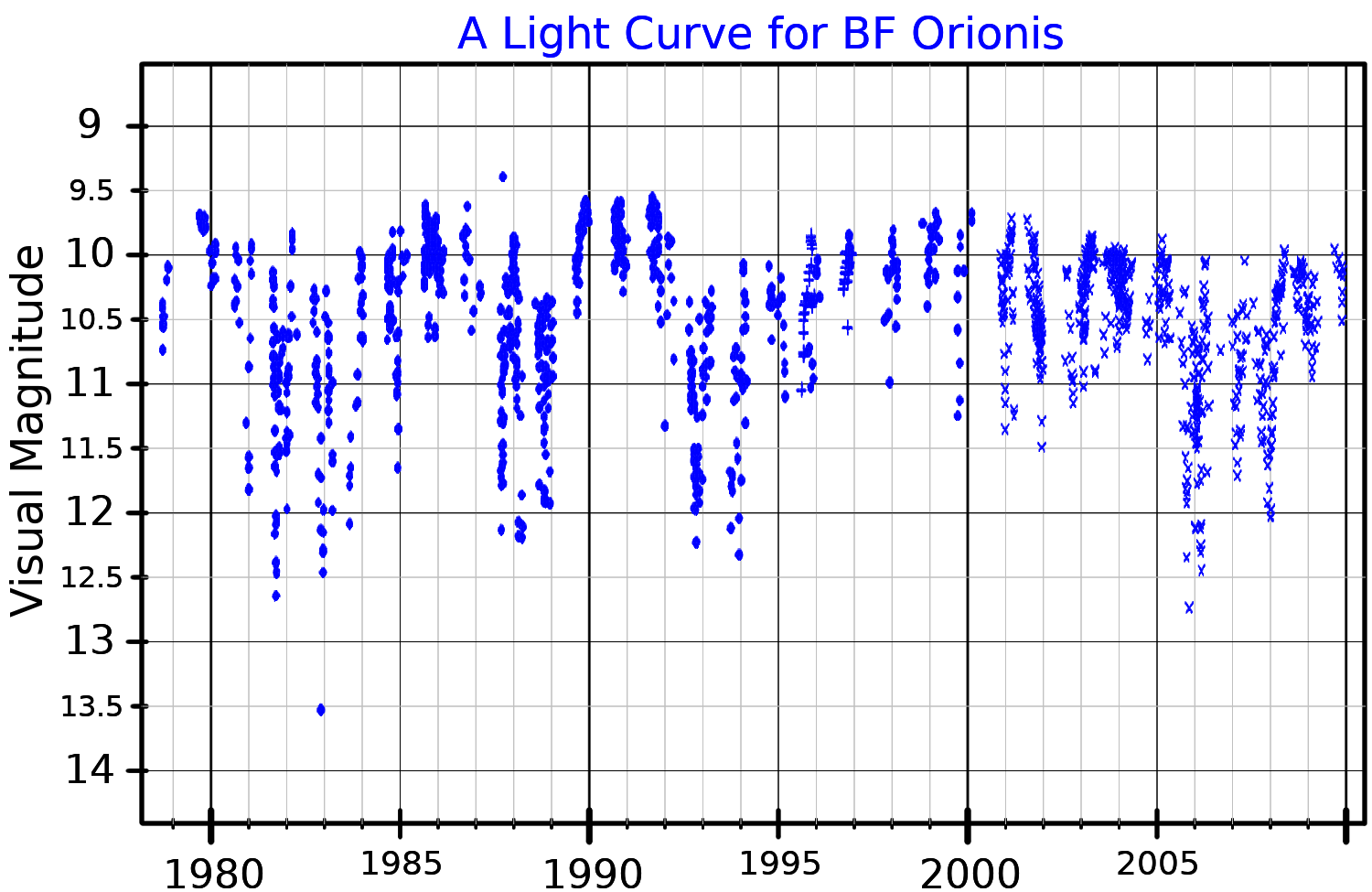
- A visual band light curve For BF Orionis, adapted from Grinin et al. (2010)

Observation data Epoch J2000 Equinox ICRS
- Constellation: Orion
- Right ascension: 05^{h} 37^{m} 13.2624^{s}
- Declination: −06° 35′ 00.565″
- Apparent magnitude (V): 9.60 to 13.47

Characteristics
- Evolutionary stage: Herbig Ae/Be star
- Spectral type: A5II-III
- Apparent magnitude (g): 10.38
- Variable type: UX Ori

Astrometry
Proper motion (μ)	RA: 0.873±0.025 mas/yr Dec.: 0.654±0.023 mas/yr
Parallax (π)	2.6173±0.0279 mas
Distance	1,250 ± 10 ly (382 ± 4 pc)

Details
Mass	1.85^{+0.15}_{−0.00} M_{☉}
Radius	1.59±0.20 R_{☉}
Luminosity	39 L_{☉}
Surface gravity (log g)	3.5 cgs
Temperature	8750 K
Rotational velocity (v sin i)	37±2 km/s
Age	17.14^{+2.80}_{−0.00} Myr

Other designations
- BD-06 1259, GSC 04778-01087, HIP 26403, 2MASS J05371326-0635005, Gaia DR2 3016930993175537536, Gaia EDR3 3016930993175889792, TYC 4778-1087-1

Database references
SIMBAD	data

BF Orionis is a young Herbig Ae/Be star in the constellation of Orion about 1250 light years away, within the Orion Nebula. It is the most massive star of the small birth cluster of four stars.

== Properties ==
BF Orionis is a Herbig Ae/Be star variable similar to UX Orionis. It is still accreting mass, producing about 2L_{☉} through the release of gravitational energy, and is surrounded by a massive, optically thick protoplanetary disk of 0.005±0.002M_{☉} visible nearly edge-on. The brightness of the star is strongly variable, with irregular deep minima down to 13th magnitude. The variations are suspected to be partly caused by a brown dwarf or massive planet embedded in the protoplanetary disk, together with very large comets.

Unlike typical Herbig Ae/Be stars, 90-95% of which do not have detectable magnetic fields, BF Orionis has a fairly strong longitudinal magnetic field of −144±21 gauss. It also has small (0.11 magnitude) short-period, single-mode pulsations of the Delta Scuti type.
