= HD 34880 =

Star in the constellation Orion

Observation data Epoch J2000.0 Equinox ICRS
- Constellation: Orion
- Right ascension: 05^{h} 20^{m} 26.4074^{s}
- Declination: −05° 22′ 03.093″
- Apparent magnitude (V): +6.42

Characteristics
- Evolutionary stage: Blue giant
- Spectral type: B8II

Astrometry
Radial velocity (R_{v})	+27.9±1.5 km/s
Proper motion (μ)	RA: −3.539±0.103 mas/yr Dec.: −3.050±0.069 mas/yr
Parallax (π)	3.3183±0.0914 mas
Distance	980 ± 30 ly (301 ± 8 pc)
Absolute magnitude (M_{V})	−1.26

Other designations
- BD−05°1225, HD 34880, HIP 24925, HR 1759, SAO 132004, PPM 187964, ADS 3926, TYC 4760-1404-1

Database references
SIMBAD	data

HD 34880 is a blue giant star of magnitude 6.41 in the constellation of Orion. It is about 980 light years from the Solar System.

== Observation ==
This star is very narrowly in the southern celestial hemisphere; this means that it can be observed from all the inhabited regions of the Earth without any difficulty and that it is invisible only far beyond the Arctic polar circle. It appears near or below the horizon, depending on season as circumpolar in innermost areas of the Antarctic continent. Being of magnitude 6.4, it is observable with the naked eye only in ideal conditions; it is easy to observe with a small pair of binoculars.

The best period for the night-time observation of Orion in either hemisphere is between late October and April. Owing to the position of the star close to the celestial equator (zodiac), it is obscured by the sun or its glare at other times of the year.

== Physical traits ==
The star is a blue giant with an absolute magnitude of −0.18 and it has a positive radial velocity indicating that the star is moving away from the Solar System.

== Multiple star ==
HD 34880 is a multiple system: made up of 3 components. The main component A is a star appearing with magnitude 6.41. The B component has magnitude 11.0, separated by 4.4 arc seconds from A at position angle 285 degrees (from north). Component C is of magnitude 9.1, separated by 0.5 arc seconds from A; its position angle is about 196 degrees.
