= 51 Orionis =

Star in the constellation of Orion

- Location of 51 Orionis (circled)

Observation data Epoch J2000 Equinox ICRS
- Constellation: Orion
- Right ascension: 05^{h} 42^{m} 28.63240^{s}
- Declination: +01° 28′ 28.6714″
- Apparent magnitude (V): 4.90

Characteristics
- Spectral type: K1III
- U−B color index: +1.06
- B−V color index: +1.17

Astrometry
Radial velocity (R_{v})	+87.55 km/s
Proper motion (μ)	RA: −54.741 mas/yr Dec.: −14.732 mas/yr
Parallax (π)	10.9178±0.2225 mas
Distance	299 ± 6 ly (92 ± 2 pc)
Absolute magnitude (M_{V})	0.13

Details
Mass	1.11 M_{☉}
Radius	19.3+0.4 −1.0 R_{☉}
Luminosity	132±3 L_{☉}
Surface gravity (log g)	2.24 cgs
Temperature	4,458+92 −51 K
Metallicity [Fe/H]	−0.45 dex
Rotational velocity (v sin i)	1.1 km/s
Age	4.06 Gyr

Other designations
- b Ori, 51 Ori, BD+01°1105, FK5 2427, GC 7136, HD 37984, HIP 26885, HR 1963, SAO 113056

Database references
SIMBAD	data

51 Orionis is a single star in the equatorial constellation of Orion. It has the Bayer designation b Orionis, while 51 Orionis is the Flamsteed designation. This object is visible to the naked eye as a faint, orange-hued star with an apparent visual magnitude of 4.90. It is located approximately 299 light-years away from the Sun based on parallax, and is drifting further away with a radial velocity of +88 km/s.

This is an aging giant star with a stellar classification of K1III, having exhausted the supply of hydrogen at its core and expanded to 19 times the Sun's radius. It is four billion years old with 1.11 times the mass of the Sun. The star is radiating 132 times the Sun's luminosity from its enlarged photosphere at an effective temperature of 4,458 K.
