= DN Orionis =

Star in the constellation Orion

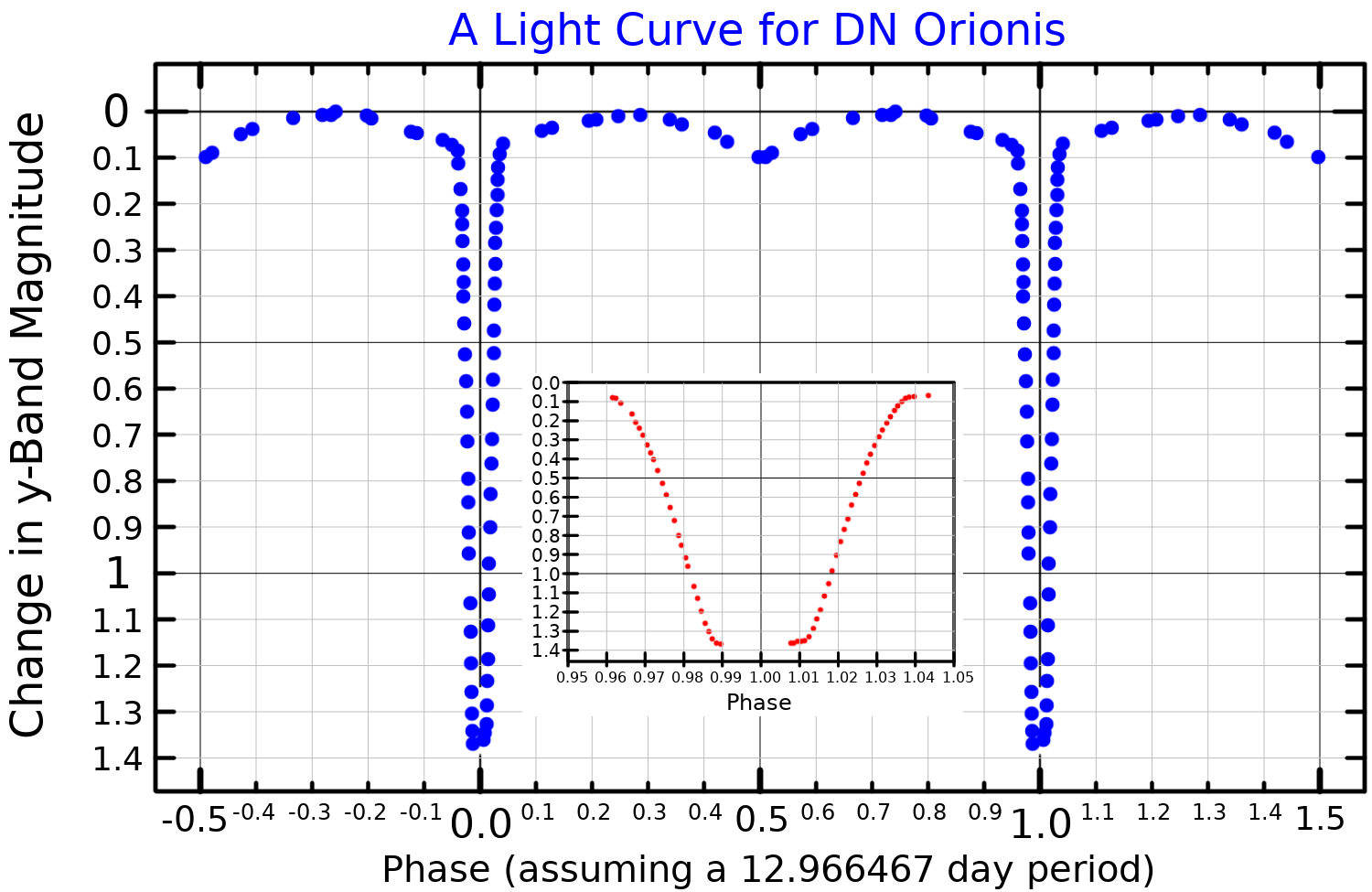
- A near-infrared (y band) light curve for DN Orionis. The main plot shows the variation over a full orbital period, and the inset plot shows the time near maximum eclipse. Adapted from Etzel and Olson (1995)

Observation data Epoch J2000 Equinox ICRS
- Constellation: Orion
- Right ascension: 06^{h} 00^{m} 28.34516^{s}
- Declination: +10° 13′ 04.9963″
- Apparent magnitude (V): 9.18

Characteristics
- Spectral type: A0 + G5III
- B−V color index: 0.240±0.026

Astrometry
Proper motion (μ)	RA: −1.771 mas/yr Dec.: −7.243 mas/yr
Parallax (π)	1.9058±0.0452 mas
Distance	1,710 ± 40 ly (520 ± 10 pc)
Absolute magnitude (M_{V})	0.19 + 0.86

Orbit
Period (P)	12.9663 d
Eccentricity (e)	0.00
Periastron epoch (T)	2,428,494.55±10.0 JD
Semi-amplitude (K_{1}) (primary)	8.2 km/s
Semi-amplitude (K_{2}) (secondary)	120.4 km/s

Details

Primary
Mass	2.80±0.05 M_{☉}
Radius	2.36±0.07 R_{☉}
Luminosity	50 L_{☉}
Surface gravity (log g)	4.14 cgs

Secondary
Mass	0.34±0.10 M_{☉}
Radius	6.66±0.15 R_{☉}
Luminosity	25 L_{☉}
Surface gravity (log g)	2.31 cgs

Other designations
- DN Ori, BD+10° 967, HD 40632, HIP 28456, SAO 95108

Database references
SIMBAD	data

DN Orionis is an Algol variable located in the constellation of Orion. The primary star is a spectral type A0 star and the secondary is an evolved giant star of type G5III. The pair form a classical Algol-type system in which each star eclipses the other once per orbit, dropping the visual magnitude from 9.14 down to 9.62 at primary minimum and 9.25 at secondary minimum. Their orbital period is close to 13 days long.

This is a slightly detached system in which the secondary is almost in contact with its Roche limit, while the primary has an accretion disk that is creating emission lines in its spectrum. The pair have an unusually low mass ratio and the secondary appears to be of very low mass and overluminous. Mass is flowing from the extended atmosphere of the cooler secondary to the hotter primary. An evolutionary history of this system suggests that the current secondary was once the primary component, but has since transferred most of its mass to the partner star as it evolved off the main sequence.
