= HD 33636 =

Binary star system in the constellation Orion

Observation data Epoch J2000.0 Equinox ICRS
- Constellation: Orion
- Right ascension: 05^{h} 11^{m} 46.44941^{s}
- Declination: +04° 24′ 12.7421″
- Apparent magnitude (V): 7.00

Characteristics
- Evolutionary stage: main sequence
- Spectral type: G0V_CH-0.3
- B−V color index: 0.588 ± 0.016

Astrometry
Radial velocity (R_{v})	5.66±0.13 km/s
Proper motion (μ)	RA: 181.259(45) mas/yr Dec.: −138.193(29) mas/yr
Parallax (π)	33.7982±0.0529 mas
Distance	96.5 ± 0.2 ly (29.59 ± 0.05 pc)
Absolute magnitude (M_{V})	4.71

Orbit
Secondary	HD 33636 B
Period (P)	5.807+0.016 −0.017 yr
Semi-major axis (a)	3.329+0.022 −0.023 AU
Eccentricity (e)	0.483±0.0063
Inclination (i)	7.07+0.62 −0.54°
Longitude of the node (Ω)	109.9+4.9 −5.0°
Periastron epoch (T)	2455442+12 −13
Argument of periastron (ω) (secondary)	338.2±1.3°

Details
Mass	1.01±0.02 M_{☉}
Radius	0.97±0.01 R_{☉}
Luminosity	1.08±0.003 L_{☉}
Surface gravity (log g)	4.46±0.02 cgs
Temperature	5,979±28 K
Age	2.5±1.1 Gyr

Other designations
- BD+04 858, HD 33636, HIP 24205, SAO 112506, G 97-25

Database references
SIMBAD	data

HD 33636 is a G-type main-sequence star located approximately 96.5 light-years away in the constellation Orion. It is a 7th magnitude star with a metallicity of −0.05±0.07. A likely substellar companion was discovered in 2002.

== Companion ==
HD 33636 b was discovered in 2002 by the Keck telescope in Hawaii using the radial velocity method. It was independently detected at the Haute-Provence Observatory in France. With this method it showed a minimum mass of 9.28 Jupiter masses, and was initially assumed to be a planet and labelled "HD 33636 b" (lower-case).

In 2007, Bean et al. used the Hubble Space Telescope (HST) astrometry to find that this body has an inclination as little as 4.1°±0.1°, which yielded a true mass of 142 M_{J}. This is too high to be a planet. It was classified by this study as an M-dwarf star of likely spectral type M6V, "HD 33636 B" (upper-case).

This picture was further revised in the 2020s. A 2023 study using astrometry from Hipparcos and Gaia found that the mass had likely been overestimated, and found a lower true mass of about 77.8 M_{J}. This would place HD 33636 b near the borderline between stars and brown dwarfs. A 2024 study using Gaia astrometry even excluded the possibility of a companion mass greater than 40 M_{J}, instead finding a mass range more compatible with the initial minimum mass estimate. This study estimated a mass of about 15.4 M_{J}, near the borderline between brown dwarfs and planets.

This object takes 2,121 days or 5.807 years to orbit at a semimajor axis of 3.33 astronomical units (AU).
