= 49 Orionis =

Star in the constellation Orion

- Location of 49 Orionis (circled)

Observation data Epoch J2000 Equinox ICRS
- Constellation: Orion
- Right ascension: 05^{h} 38^{m} 53.08332^{s}
- Declination: −07° 12′ 46.1667″
- Apparent magnitude (V): 4.80

Characteristics
- Evolutionary stage: main sequence
- Spectral type: A4Vn
- U−B color index: +0.11
- B−V color index: +0.13

Astrometry
Radial velocity (R_{v})	−5.30 km/s
Proper motion (μ)	RA: −15.562 mas/yr Dec.: −50.613 mas/yr
Parallax (π)	23.1346±0.2801 mas
Distance	141 ± 2 ly (43.2 ± 0.5 pc)
Absolute magnitude (M_{V})	1.52

Details
Mass	1.78 M_{☉}
Radius	2.0 R_{☉}
Luminosity	22 L_{☉}
Surface gravity (log g)	4.06 cgs
Temperature	8,416±286 K
Rotational velocity (v sin i)	186 km/s
Age	284 Myr

Other designations
- d Ori, 49 Ori, BD−07°1142, GC 7039, GJ 9187, HD 37507, HIP 26563, HR 1937, SAO 132411

Database references
SIMBAD	data

49 Orionis is a single star in the equatorial constellation of Orion. It has the Bayer designation d Orionis, while 49 Orionis is the Flamsteed designation. This object is visible to the naked eye as a faint, white-hued star with an apparent visual magnitude of 4.80. It is located 141 light-years away from the Sun based on parallax, but is drifting closer with a radial velocity of −5 km/s.

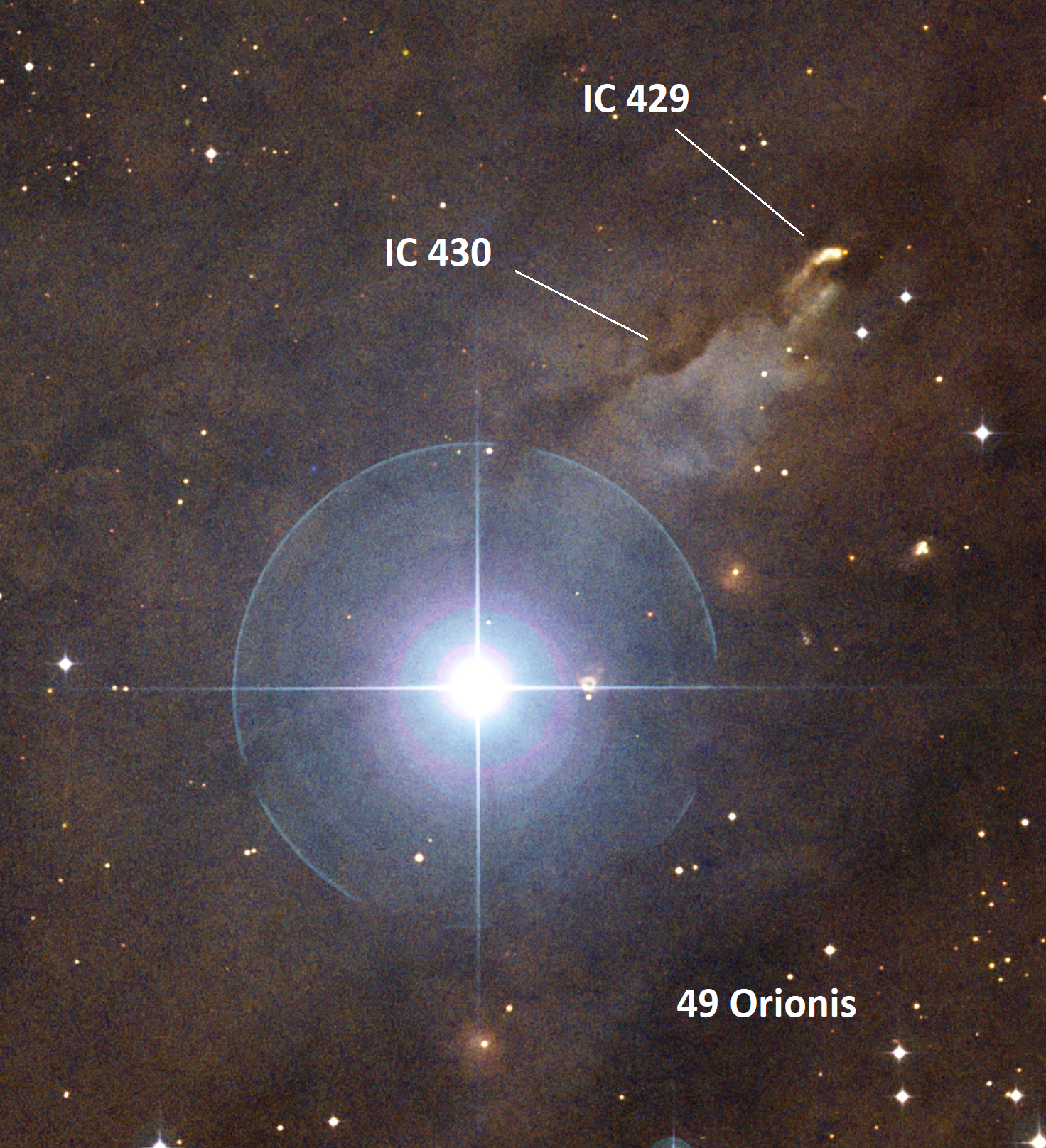
49 Orionis (center)

In the past 49 Orionis was reported as a spectroscopic binary and an orbit was computed with a period of 445.74 days and an eccentricity of 0.549. But it was later determined to be single.

This object is an A-type main-sequence star with a stellar classification of A4Vn, where the 'n' suffix indicates broadened "nebulous" lines caused by rapid rotation. It is around 284 million years old with a projected rotational velocity of 186 km/s. This spin is giving the star an oblate shape with an equatorial bulge that is an estimated 8% larger than the polar radius. The star has 1.8 times the mass of the Sun and double the Sun's radius. It is radiating 22 times the Sun's luminosity from its photosphere at an effective temperature of 8,416 K.
