= 31 Orionis =

Binary star in the constellation Orion

- Location of 31 Orionis (circled)

Observation data Epoch J2000 Equinox ICRS
- Constellation: Orion
- Right ascension: 05^{h} 29^{m} 43.98147^{s}
- Declination: −01° 05′ 32.0582″
- Apparent magnitude (V): 4.71 + 10.2

Characteristics
- Spectral type: K5III + F7V
- U−B color index: +1.91
- B−V color index: +1.58
- Variable type: SR?

Astrometry
Radial velocity (R_{v})	+6.02±0.15 km/s
Proper motion (μ)	RA: +1.242 mas/yr Dec.: −25.476 mas/yr
Parallax (π)	6.6135±0.2293 mas
Distance	490 ± 20 ly (151 ± 5 pc)
Absolute magnitude (M_{V})	−1.23

Details

31 Ori A
Mass	5.2 M_{☉}
Radius	62 R_{☉}
Luminosity	1,361 L_{☉}
Surface gravity (log g)	0.92 cgs
Temperature	4,610 K
Metallicity [Fe/H]	−0.21 dex
Rotational velocity (v sin i)	2.7 km/s

31 Ori B
Mass	1.1 M_{☉}
Radius	1.2 R_{☉}
Luminosity	1.9 L_{☉}
Surface gravity (log g)	4.24 cgs
Temperature	6,111 K
Metallicity [Fe/H]	−0.23 dex
Age	3.9 Gyr

Other designations
- 31 Ori, CI Ori, BD−01°913, GC 6792, HD 36167, HIP 25737, HR 1834, SAO 132176, CCDM J05297-0106A, WDS J05297-0106A

Database references
SIMBAD	data

31 Orionis is a binary star system in the equatorial constellation of Orion, located near the bright star Mintaka. It is visible to the naked eye as a faint, orange-hued point of light with a baseline apparent visual magnitude of 4.71. The distance to this system is approximately 490 light years away based on parallax, and it is drifting further away with a mean radial velocity of +6 km/s.

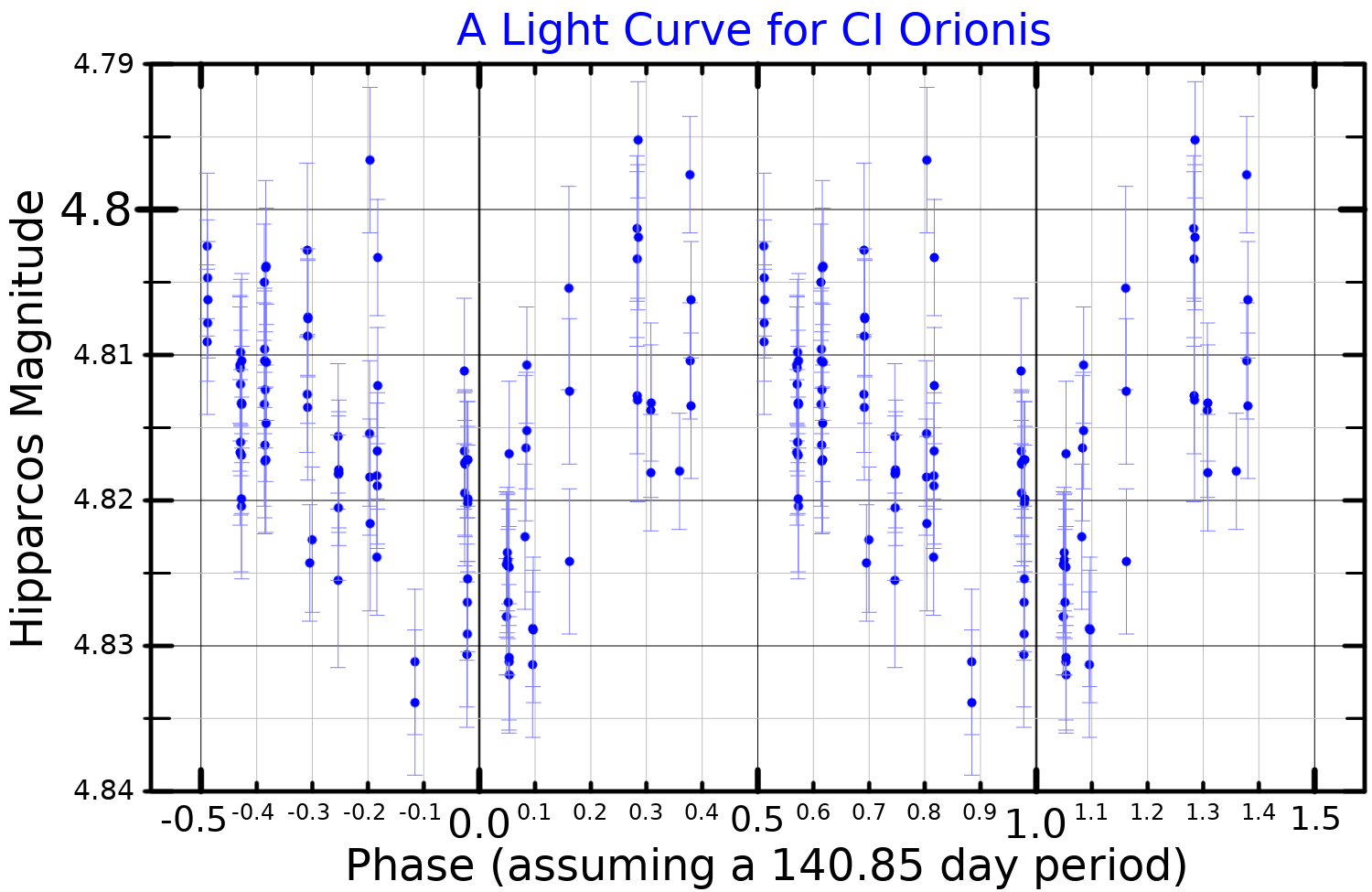
A light curve for CI Orionis, plotted from Hipparcos data

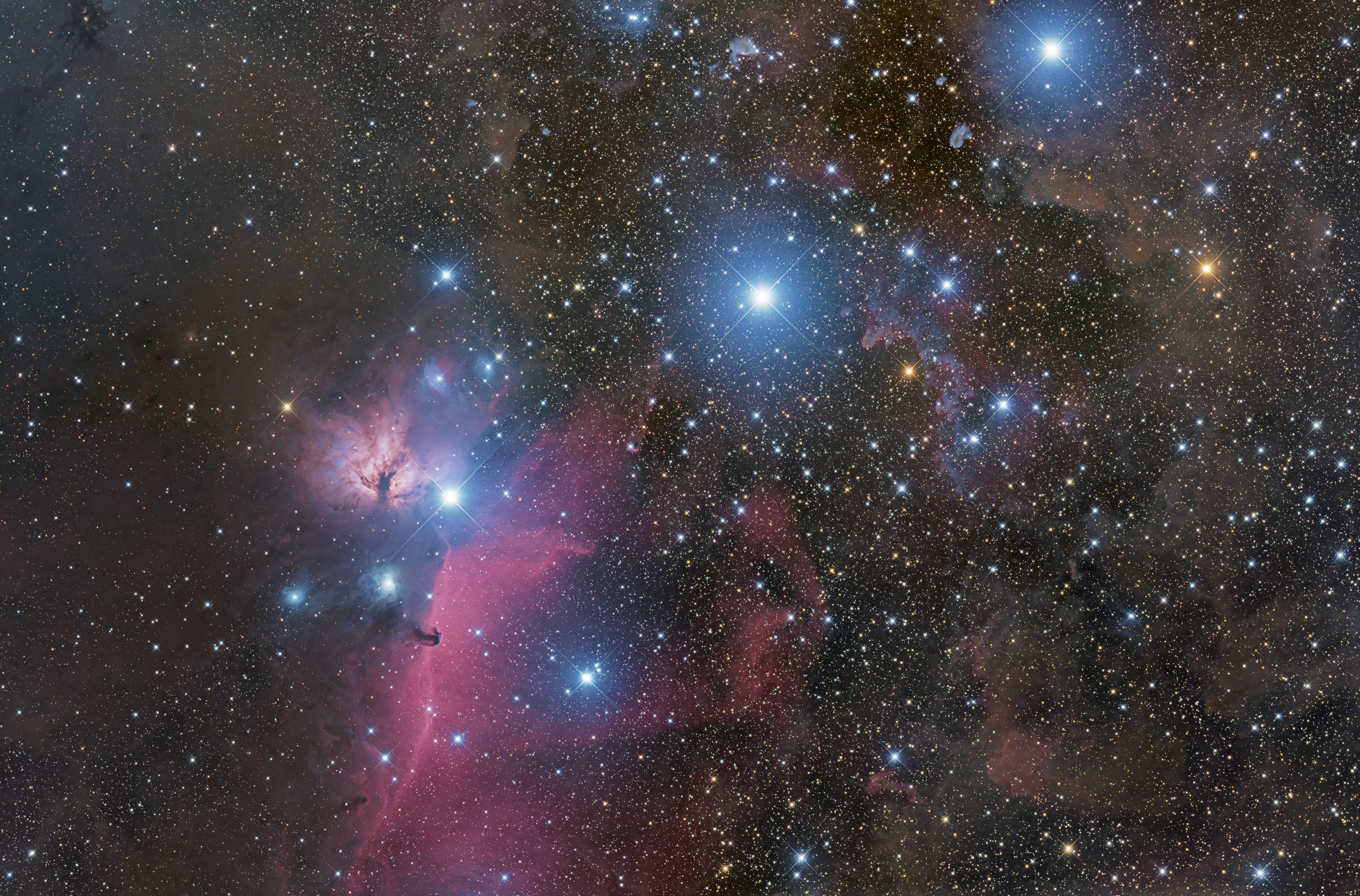
Orion's Belt, with the orange 31 Orionis towards the west (right)

As of 2008, the pair had an angular separation of 12.7″. The brighter member, designated component A, is an aging giant star with a stellar classification of K5III. It is reported as a semi-regular variable with magnitude ranging from 4.68 to 4.72 over 141 days, although the General Catalogue of Variable Stars describes this as unconfirmed by subsequent observations. It has the variable star designation CI Orionis, while 31 Orionis is the Flamsteed designation. The magnitude 10.2 companion star, component B, is an F-type main-sequence star with a class of F7V.
