= HD 42618 =

Star in the constellation of Orion

Observation data Epoch J2000.0 Equinox ICRS
- Constellation: Orion
- Right ascension: 06^{h} 12^{m} 00.567^{s}
- Declination: +06° 46′ 59.06″
- Apparent magnitude (V): 6.85

Characteristics
- Evolutionary stage: Main sequence
- Spectral type: G4V
- B−V color index: 0.642±0.007

Astrometry
Radial velocity (R_{v})	−53.52±0.14 km/s
Proper motion (μ)	RA: 197.247 mas/yr Dec.: −254.867 mas/yr
Parallax (π)	40.9764±0.0240 mas
Distance	79.60 ± 0.05 ly (24.40 ± 0.01 pc)
Absolute magnitude (M_{V})	+4.99

Details
Mass	0.92±0.02 M_{☉}
Radius	0.94 R_{☉}
Luminosity	0.918±0.012 L_{☉}
Surface gravity (log g)	4.44±0.01 cgs
Temperature	5,758±5 K 5,765±17 K
Metallicity [Fe/H]	−0.096±0.005 dex −0.10±0.02 dex
Rotation	16.9 d
Rotational velocity (v sin i)	1.83±0.11 km/s
Age	5.51±0.71 Gyr; 5.5±0.2 Gyr

Other designations
- BD+06 1155, GC 7897, GJ 3387, HD 42618, HIP 29432, SAO 113580, LTT 11802

Database references
SIMBAD	data

HD 42618 is a well-studied star with an exoplanetary companion in the equatorial constellation of Orion. With an apparent visual magnitude of 6.85 it is too faint to be readily visible to the naked eye. This system is located at a distance of 79.6 light years from the Sun based on parallax measurements. It has a relatively high proper motion, traversing the celestial sphere at an angular rate of 0.321″ per year. HD 42618 is drifting closer with a radial velocity of −53.5 km/s and is predicted to come as near as 42.6 light-years in around 297,000 years.

The stellar classification of HD 42618 is G4V, which shows it to be an ordinary G-type main-sequence star. It is considered a close solar analog, which means the physical properties of the star are particularly similar to those of the Sun. Seismic model indicates the star is older and more evolved than the Sun with an age of about 5.5 billion years. It is spinning with a low projected rotational velocity of 1.8 km/s, with the rotation rate being consistent with the star's low activity level. The star has 92% of the mass of the Sun and 94% of the Sun's radius. The surface metallicity is lower than in the Sun, with the abundance patterns being consistent with a solar-type star. HD 42618 is radiating 92% of the luminosity of the Sun from its photosphere at an effective temperature of 5,765 K.

In 2016, the discovery of a candidate exoplanet companion orbiting HD 42618 was announced. Designated HD 42618 b, it was found using the radial velocity method which showed a periodicity of 149.6 days. The orbital elements have the planet orbiting at a distance of 0.55 AU from the host star with an orbital eccentricity (ovalness) of 0.2 and a Neptune-like mass. A second signal with a period of 388 days was detected, but this is unconfirmed and may be false. A 4,850 day signal is likely the result of star's magnetic activity cycle.

The planetary system
Companion (in order from star)	Mass	Semimajor axis (AU)	Orbital period (days)	Eccentricity	Inclination (°)	Radius
b	≥ 14.4+2.5 −2.4 M_{🜨}	0.554±0.011	149.61^{+0.37}_{−0.34}	0.19^{+0.15}_{−0.12}	—	—
