= HD 39118 =

Triple stellar system in the constellation Orion

HD 39118 and HD 39119
- Location of HD 39118 (circled in red)

Observation data Epoch J2000 Equinox J2000
- Constellation: Orion
- Right ascension: 05^{h} 50^{m} 30.03^{s}
- Declination: +02° 01′ 28.9″
- Apparent magnitude (V): 5.976

Characteristics

Cool primary
- Evolutionary stage: Horizontal branch
- Spectral type: K0II
- Apparent magnitude (B): 6.83±0.015
- Apparent magnitude (G): 5.64
- Apparent magnitude (J): 4.193±0.238
- Apparent magnitude (H): 3.502±0.194
- Apparent magnitude (K): 3.337±0.19
- B−V color index: 1.12

Hot secondary
- Evolutionary stage: Main sequence + Main sequence
- Spectral type: B7/B8V + A0:V
- B−V color index: −0.09

Astrometry
| Radial velocity (R_{v}) | 4.24 km/s |
| Proper motion (μ) | RA: +1.097 mas/yr Dec.: −5.161 mas/yr |
| Parallax (π) | 1.4703±0.2299 mas |
| Distance | 2300+350 −270 ly (707.6+107 −83.3 pc) |
| Absolute magnitude (M_{V}) | –2.53 (–2.3 (primary) + –0.75 (secondary)) |

Orbit
| Primary | Cool primary |
| Companion | Hot secondary |
| Period (P) | 2570±13 d 7.04±0.04 year |
| Semi-major axis (a) | 4.7×10^{8} km 3.14 AU |
| Eccentricity (e) | 0.3±0.007 |

Details

K-type giant
| Mass | 3.3+0.3 −0.27 M_{☉} |
| Radius | 23.5+3.7 −1.9 R_{☉} |
| Luminosity | 535 L_{☉} |
| Surface gravity (log g) | 1.52 cgs |
| Temperature | 4,550 K |
| Metallicity [Fe/H] | −0.34 dex |
| Rotational velocity (v sin i) | 4.19 km/s |
| Age | 257 Myr |

B-type star
| Temperature | 11,300 K |

Other designations
- BD+01 1148, Gaia DR2 3316078695157768448, Gaia DR3 3316078695157768448, HD 39118/39119, HIP 27588, HR 2024, SAO 113198, PPM 149543, TIC 158867386, TYC 120-877-1, GSC 00120-00877, IRAS 05478+0200, 2MASS J05503003+0201290

Database references
| SIMBAD | data |

HD 39118 (HD 39119, HR 2024) is a spectroscopic binary star in the constellation Orion, close to the celestial equator. It is made up from three stars: a cool primary (a K-type giant star) and a hot secondary, which is a binary star formed from a B-type main-sequence star and an A-type main-sequence star. A 2021 estimate derive a distance of 708 parsecs (2,310 ly) to HD 39118, and it is moving away from Earth at a speed of 4.24 km/s. The apparent magnitude is 5.976, making it visible to the naked eye only from dark skies.

== Characteristics ==
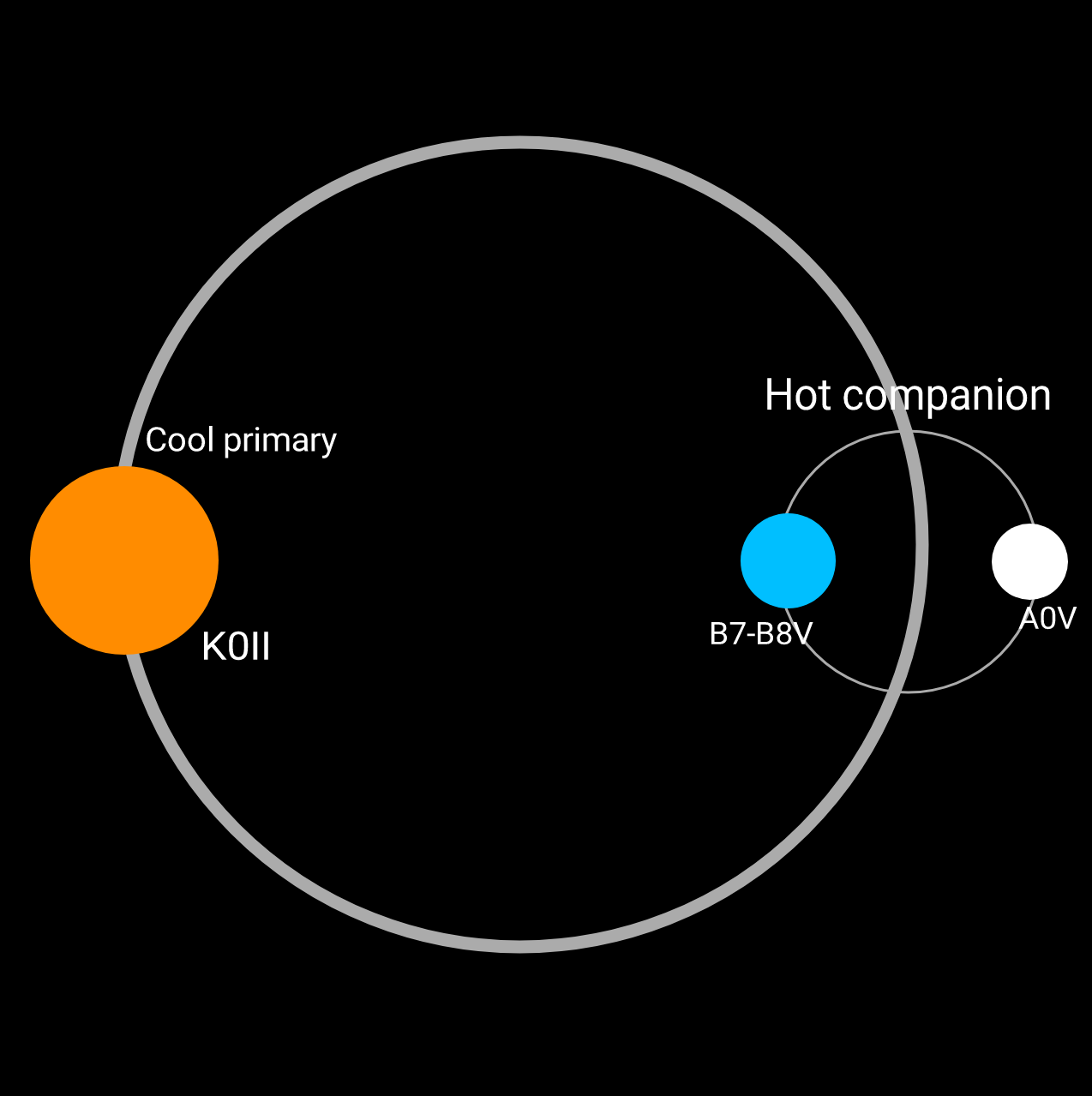
Basic layout of the HR 2024 system

HR 2024 is a spectroscopic binary (more precisely a single-lined spectroscopic binary) made up of a cool primary and a hot secondary, which is also a binary star. The designations “cool” and “hot” refer to the relative effective temperature of the components. They are separated by 4.7×10^{8} kilometres (3.1 AU), and complete an orbit around each other every 2,570 days (7 years). The orbital eccentricity is equivalent to 0.3.

HD 39118 can be seen in the northern celestial hemisphere, close to the celestial equator, at a distance of 708 parsecs (2,310 light-years) in the constellation Orion. It has an apparent magnitude of 5.976. At this magnitude, it is visible to the naked eye only in dark skies, being close to the limiting magnitude to naked-eye vision of 6.5. The absolute magnitude, i.e. its brightness if it was seen at a distance or 10 parsecs (32.6 ly), is –2.53. It is moving away from Earth at a velocity of 4.24 km/s.

The Henry Draper Catalogue recognises that the spectrum is composite: the designation HD 39118 is applied to component A with spectral class G0; HD 39119 is applied to component B with spectral class A0, although both entries have the same position and magnitude.

=== Primary star ===
The primary has a spectral classification of K0II, meaning that it is a K-type star that has evolved away from the main sequence and is now a bright giant star. Currently, it is on the horizontal branch, fusing helium in its core. It is 3.28 times more massive than the Sun and has expanded to 25 times the Sun's size. It emits a luminosity 535 times the solar luminosity from its photosphere at an effective temperature of 4,550 K, which is around 1,200 K cooler than the Sun. (Note: The Sun's effective temperature is 5772 K.) It has a subsolar metallicity, having an abundance of iron on its surface equivalent to 46% that of the Sun. The age of the primary is estimated at 263 million years, much younger than the Sun (4.6 billion years) despite its advanced evolutionary stage. It rotates on its own axis at a projected velocity of 4.19 km/s. The B-V index is of 1.12, giving it the typical orange hue of a K-type star. (Note: See the color index article)

=== Hot companion ===
The hot companion is made up of two other stars, one is a late B-type main-sequence star (spectral type B7V/B8V) and the other is an early A-type main-sequence star (spectral type A0V). They have a combined brightness about 1.55 magnitudes fainter than the cooler primary star. The B-type star has an effective temperature of 11,300 K. Although stars cannot be resolved, it is calculated that the combined B-V index of the hot companions is –0.09, meaning that it has a typical hue of a B-type star.
