= 11 Orionis =

Star in the constellation Orion

- Location of 11 Orionis (circled)

Observation data Epoch J2000 Equinox ICRS
- Constellation: Orion
- Right ascension: 05^{h} 04^{m} 34.14916^{s}
- Declination: +15° 24′ 14.7771″
- Apparent magnitude (V): 4.65 – 4.69

Characteristics
- Spectral type: B9 IV or A1 Vp SiCr
- U−B color index: −0.10
- B−V color index: −0.06
- Variable type: α² CVn

Astrometry
Radial velocity (R_{v})	+16.80 km/s
Proper motion (μ)	RA: +17.80 mas/yr Dec.: −31.15 mas/yr
Parallax (π)	8.93±0.24 mas
Distance	365 ± 10 ly (112 ± 3 pc)
Absolute magnitude (M_{V})	−0.59

Details
Mass	2.7 M_{☉}
Radius	4.3 R_{☉}
Luminosity	220 L_{☉}
Surface gravity (log g)	3.6 cgs
Temperature	9,520 K
Rotational velocity (v sin i)	63.3±3.6 km/s

Other designations
- 11 Ori, V1032 Ori, BD+15°732, FK5 1140, GC 6191, HD 32549, HIP 23607, HR 1638, SAO 94290

Database references
SIMBAD	data

11 Orionis is a solitary Ap star in the equatorial constellation of Orion, near the border with Taurus. It is visible to the naked eye with an apparent visual magnitude of 4.65, and it is located approximately 365 light years away from the Sun based on parallax. The star is moving further from the Sun with a heliocentric radial velocity of +16.8 km/s.

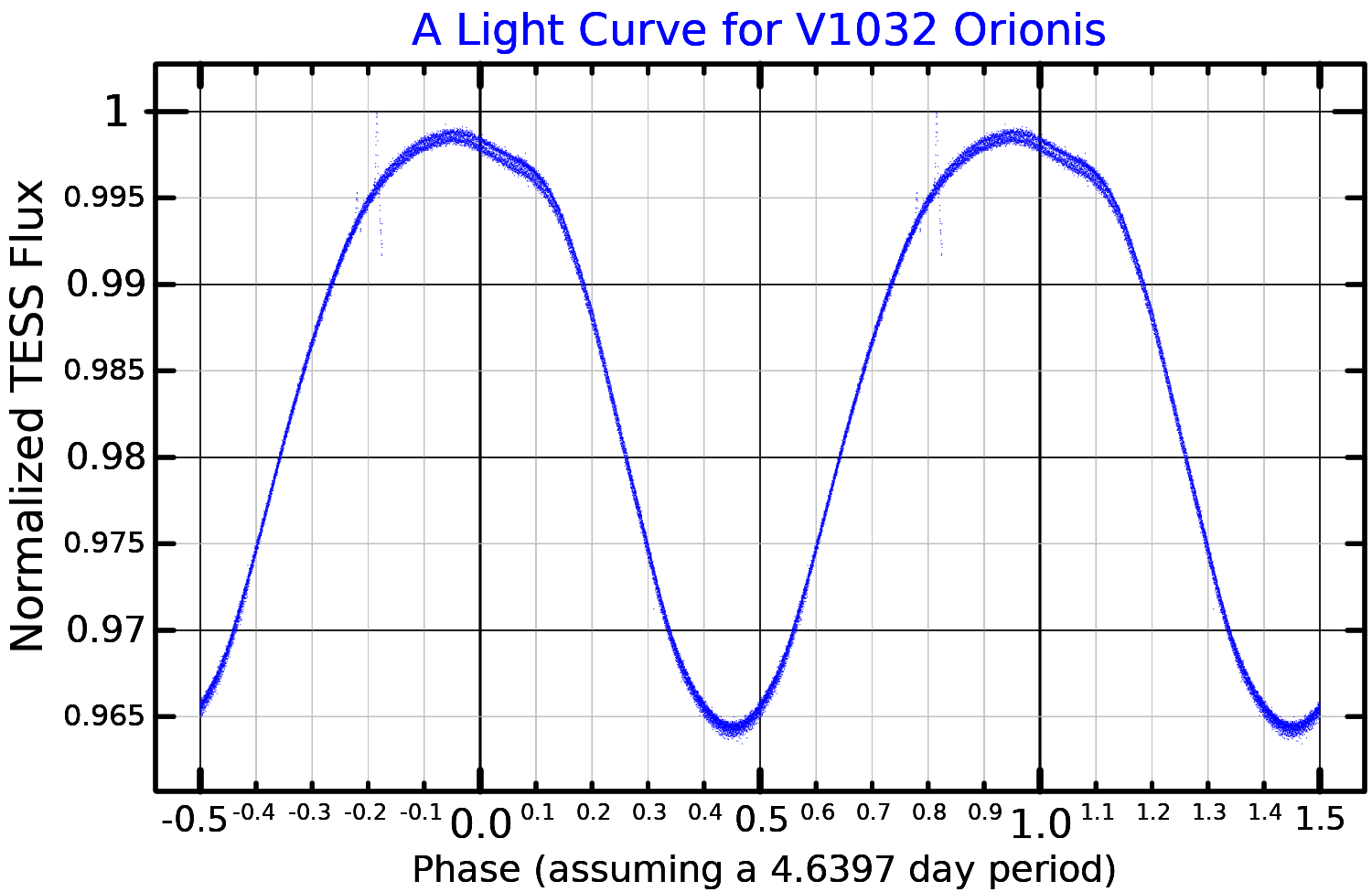
A light curve for V1032 Orionis, plotted from TESS data

This object is a chemically peculiar star, known as an Ap star, with enhanced silicon and chromium lines in its spectrum. It is an α² CVn variable, ranging from 4.65 to 4.69 magnitude with a period of 4.64 days. The magnetic field measured from metal lines has a strength of +160±390 G.
