= 23 Orionis =

Double star in the constellation Orion

Observation data Epoch J2000 Equinox J2000
- Constellation: Orion
- Right ascension: 05^{h} 22^{m} 50.00474^{s}
- Declination: +03° 32′ 39.9770″
- Apparent magnitude (V): 4.99 (4.95 + 6.76)

Characteristics
- Evolutionary stage: main sequence
- Spectral type: B1Ⅴ + B3Ⅴn
- B−V color index: −0.096±0.004

Astrometry
Absolute magnitude (M_{V})	−2.93

23 Ori A
Radial velocity (R_{v})	+18.0±3.7 km/s
Proper motion (μ)	RA: −2.414 mas/yr Dec.: +1.230 mas/yr
Parallax (π)	2.7199±0.3155 mas
Distance	approx. 1,200 ly (approx. 370 pc)

23 Ori B
Radial velocity (R_{v})	28 km/s
Proper motion (μ)	RA: +1.275 mas/yr Dec.: −0.552 mas/yr
Parallax (π)	2.5579±0.0864 mas
Distance	1,280 ± 40 ly (390 ± 10 pc)

Details

23 Ori A
Mass	12.5±0.6 M_{☉}
Radius	6.97 R_{☉}
Luminosity	26,546 L_{☉}
Surface gravity (log g)	4.078±0.045 cgs
Temperature	25,400 K
Rotational velocity (v sin i)	350 km/s
Age	15.4±0.6 Myr

23 Ori B
Mass	6.6±0.1 M_{☉}
Radius	4.71 R_{☉}
Luminosity	1,620 L_{☉}
Temperature	18,700 K
Rotational velocity (v sin i)	370 km/s
Age	22.8±2.3 Myr

Other designations
- 23 Ori, SAO 112697, WDS J05228+0333
- A: BD+03°871, HD 35149, HIP 25142, HR 1770, SAO 112697
- B: BD+03°872, HD 35148, HIP 25145, SAO 112699

Database references
SIMBAD	data
- B

23 Orionis is a double star located around 1,200 light-years (370 parsecs) away from the Sun in the equatorial constellation of Orion. It is visible to the naked eye as a dim, blue-white-hued point of light with a combined apparent visual magnitude of 4.99. The pair are moving away from the Earth with a heliocentric radial velocity of +18 km/s, and they are members of the Orion OB1 association, subgroup 1a.

Howe and Clarke (2009) catalog this as a double-lined spectroscopic binary star system with a wide projected separation of 9,460 AU. As of 2018, they had an angular separation of 31.9″ along a position angle of 30°. The brighter member, component A, is a B-type main-sequence star with a stellar classification of B1V. The secondary, component B, is of class B3V. Both stars are spinning rapidly.
