= HD 37320 =

Blue giant star in the constellation Orion

Observation data Epoch J2000 Equinox J2000
- Constellation: Orion (Note: Obtained with a right ascension of 05^{h} 38^{m} 01.12^{s} and a declination of +07° 32′ 29.1″ on this website.)
- Right ascension: 05^{h} 38^{m} 01.12^{s}
- Declination: +07° 32′ 29.1″
- Apparent magnitude (V): 5.852±0.009

Characteristics
- Evolutionary stage: Blue giant
- Spectral type: B7III
- Apparent magnitude (U): 5.44
- Apparent magnitude (B): 5.788
- Apparent magnitude (G): 5.844
- Apparent magnitude (J): 5.933
- Apparent magnitude (H): 5.997
- Apparent magnitude (K): 5.964

Astrometry
Radial velocity (R_{v})	20.1±1 km/s
Proper motion (μ)	RA: 10.602 mas/yr Dec.: -15.499 mas/yr
Parallax (π)	3.5025±0.0568 mas
Distance	930 ± 20 ly (286 ± 5 pc)
Absolute magnitude (M_{V})	-1.43

Details
Mass	5.644±0.282 M_{☉}
Radius	4.696 (Note: From an angular diameter of 0.153 milliarcseconds and a distance of 285.5 parsecs.) R_{☉}
Luminosity	218.78 L_{☉}
Temperature	12,303 K
Rotational velocity (v sin i)	25 km/s

Other designations
- BD+07 953, HIP 26487, HR 1920, SAO 112979, PPM 149251, TIC 144611068, TYC 714-524-1, GSC 00714-00524, 2MASS J05380112+0732292, Gaia DR2 3334369174165649536, Gaia DR3 3334369174165649536

Database references
SIMBAD	data

HD 37320 (HR 1920, HIP 26487) is a star located in the constellation Orion. It is an evolved blue giant star, based on its spectral type of B8III. The distance to HD 37320 is calculated at 285.5 parsecs (931 light-years), based on a parallax from Gaia EDR3. The apparent magnitude of the star is 5.852, which is above the limiting magnitude for naked-eye vision (6.5^{m}), making it faintly visible to the naked eye.

== Characteristics ==
It is an evolved blue giant star with a spectral type of B8III. It radiates about 219 times the solar luminosity by its photosphere at an effective temperature of 12,300 K. Its uniform disk angular diameter is measured at 0.153 milliarcseconds. At the estimated distance by Gaia EDR3, it yields a physical size of 4.696 R_{☉}. The star has a mass of 5.644 M_{☉} and rotates under its own axis at a speed of 25 km/s.

HD 37320 is located within the constellation Orion, based on its astronomical coordinates. The distance to the star is 285.5 parsecs (931 light-years), based on a parallax of 3.5025 mas from Gaia EDR3. The apparent magnitude of the star, i.e. its brightness as seen from Earth, is of 5.852^{m}, which is above the limiting magnitude for naked-eye vision, generally defined as 6.5^{m}, making it faintly visible to the naked eye. The absolute magnitude of HD 37320, i.e. its brightness if it was seen at 10 parsecs (32.6 ly), is -1.43. It is moving away from Earth at a velocity of 20.1 km/s.

HD 37320 is the Henry Draper Catalogue designation for this star. Other designations include HR 1920 from the Bright Star Catalogue, HIP 26487 from the Hipparcos Catalogue and BD+07 953 from the Bonner Durchmusterung catalogue.
