= HD 36780 =

Star in the constellation Orion

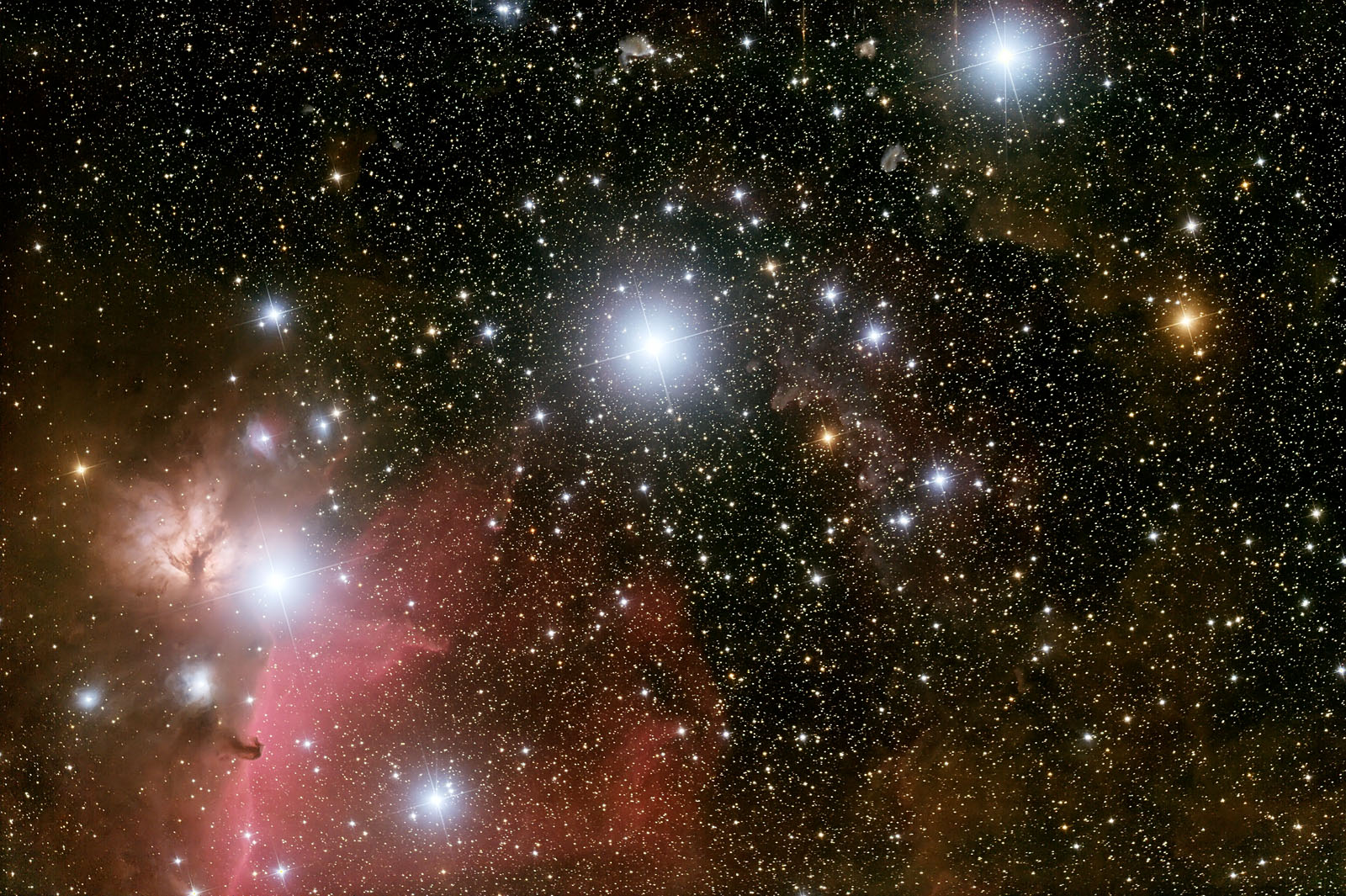
- Location of HD 36780 (circled) in the Orion's Belt region Credit: Martin Mutti

Observation data Epoch J2000 Equinox ICRS
- Constellation: Orion
- Right ascension: 05^{h} 34^{m} 04.04753^{s}
- Declination: −01° 28′ 12.8726″
- Apparent magnitude (V): +5.92

Characteristics
- Evolutionary stage: giant
- Spectral type: K4 III
- U−B color index: +1.87
- B−V color index: +1.535±0.008

Astrometry
| Radial velocity (R_{v}) | 82.45±0.21 km/s |
| Proper motion (μ) | RA: −8.295 mas/yr Dec.: −31.553 mas/yr |
| Parallax (π) | 6.2074±0.0975 mas |
| Distance | 525 ± 8 ly (161 ± 3 pc) |
| Absolute magnitude (M_{V}) | −0.65 |

Details
| Mass | 1.2 M_{☉} |
| Radius | 33.8 R_{☉} |
| Luminosity | 279 L_{☉} |
| Surface gravity (log g) | 1.43 cgs |
| Temperature | 4,058 K |
| Rotational velocity (v sin i) | 2.1 km/s |
| Age | 12.4 Gyr |

Other designations
- BD−01°950, GC 6894, HD 36780, HIP 26108, HR 1874, SAO 132270

Database references
| SIMBAD | data |

HD 36780 is a star located in Orion's Belt, within the equatorial constellation of Orion. It has an orange hue and is dimly visible to the naked eye with an apparent visual magnitude of +5.92. The distance to this object is approximately 525 light years based on parallax. It is drifting away from the Sun with a radial velocity of 82 km/s, having come to within 185.6 light-years some 2.1 million years ago.

This is an aging giant star with a stellar classification of K4 III. After exhausting the supply of hydrogen at its core, the star cooled and expanded off the main sequence. At present it has around 34 times the girth of the Sun. It is radiating 279 times the luminosity of the Sun from its swollen photosphere at an effective temperature of 4,058 K.
