= Omega Orionis =

Variable star in the constellation Orion

ω Orionis
- Location of ω Orionis (circled)

Observation data Epoch J2000.0 Equinox J2000.0 (ICRS)
- Constellation: Orion
- Right ascension: 05^{h} 39^{m} 11.14632^{s}
- Declination: +04° 07′ 17.2795″
- Apparent magnitude (V): 4.57

Characteristics
- Spectral type: B3 Ve
- U−B color index: −0.76
- B−V color index: −0.11

Astrometry
Radial velocity (R_{v})	20.4 km/s
Proper motion (μ)	RA: +0.84 mas/yr Dec.: +0.00 mas/yr
Parallax (π)	2.36±0.29 mas
Distance	approx. 1,400 ly (approx. 420 pc)

Details
Mass	7.0±0.5 M_{☉}
Radius	5.9 R_{☉}
Luminosity	6,031 L_{☉}
Surface gravity (log g)	3.59±0.10 cgs
Temperature	19,000±500 K
Rotation	1.37 d
Rotational velocity (v sin i)	179±4 km/s
Age	43.6 Myr

Other designations
- ω Ori, 47 Orionis, BD+04°1002, FK5 2423, HD 37490, HIP 26594, HR 1934, SAO 113001

Database references
SIMBAD	data

Omega Orionis (ω Ori) is a single star in the constellation Orion. Its apparent magnitude is 4.57 and is located approximately 1,400 light-years from the Solar System. It is surrounded by a cloud of dust, forming a modest reflection nebula over a light-year wide.

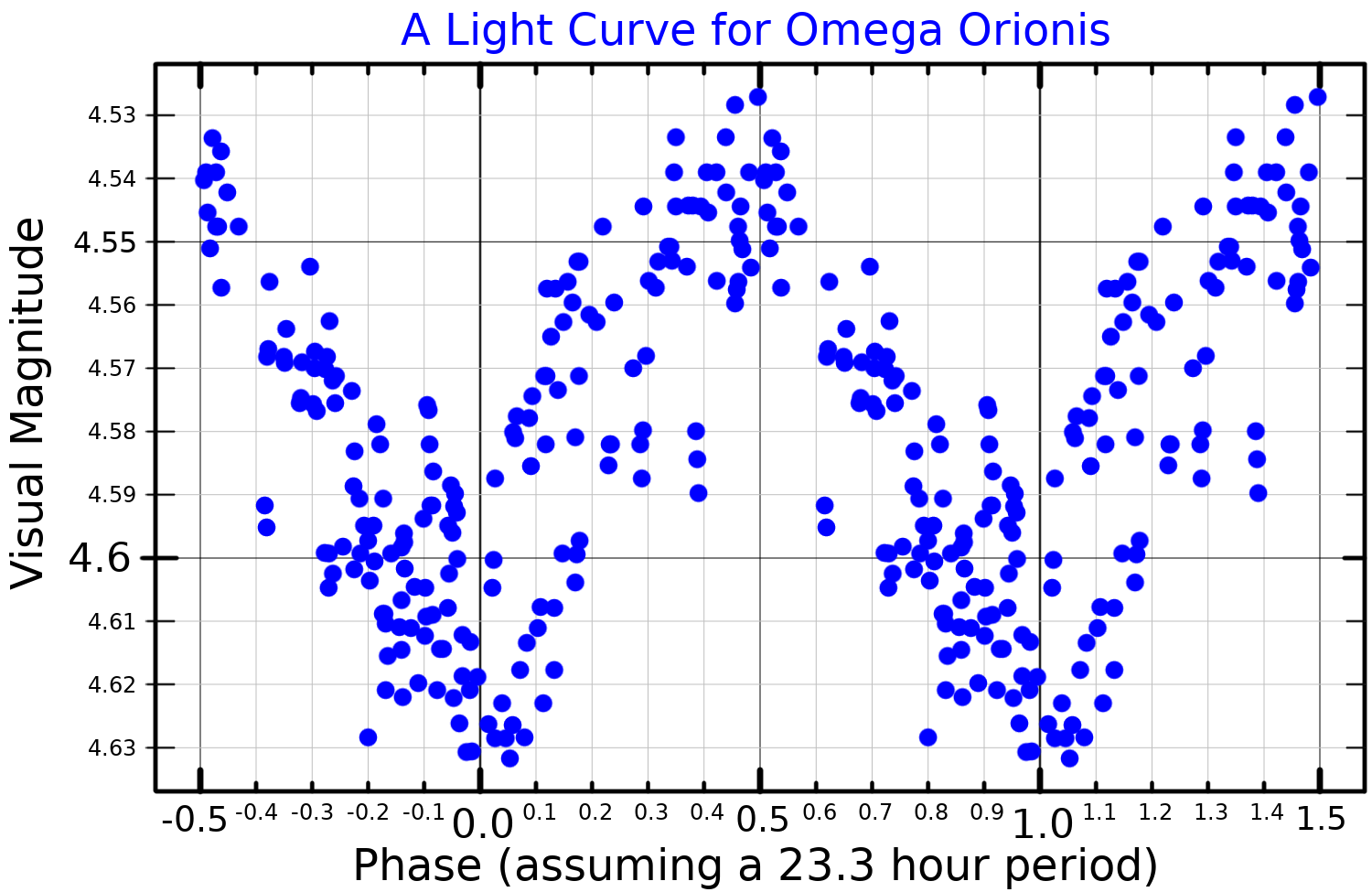
A visual band light curve for Omega Orionis, adapted from Balona et al. (2001)

Omega Orionis is a B-type main sequence star of spectral type B3 Ve with an effective temperature of 19,000 K. Including a large amount of ultraviolet radiation, Omega Orionis shines with a Luminosity 6,031 times greater than the Sun's and it has a radius 5.9 times larger than solar radius, The projected rotation speed is 179 km/s – involves a period of 1.37 days rotation. However, actual rotation speed can reach 450 km/s, it estimated that its axis is inclined 24° relative to the line of sight. The star has a mass 7.0 times that of the Sun, just below the limit beyond which stars explode as supernovas. Its age is estimated at 43.6 million years.

As a result of its rapid rotation, Omega Orionis is a Be class star. Among the stars of this class, Omega Orionis was the first where the magnetic field was measured and found to be 1000 times that of the Earth. Omega Orionis is, like many Be stars, a variable star whose brightness varies 0.19 magnitudes. Also, small variations have been observed due to non-radial pulsations with periods of 0.97 and 2.19 days.
