= New Catalogue of Suspected Variable Stars =

Star catalogue

The New Catalogue of Suspected Variable Stars (NSV) is a star catalogue containing 14,811 stars which, although suspected to be variable, were not given variable star designations prior to 1980. It was published in 1982.
