= Orion in Chinese astronomy =

The modern constellation Orion lies across two of the quadrants, symbolized by the White Tiger of the West (西方白虎, Xī Fāng Bái Hǔ) and Vermilion Bird of the South (南方朱雀, Nán Fāng Zhū Què), that divide the sky in traditional Chinese uranography.

The name of the western constellation in modern Chinese is 猎户座 (liè hù zuò), meaning "the hunter constellation".

== Stars ==
The map of Chinese constellation in constellation Orion area consists of :

Four Symbols	Mansion (Chinese name)	Romanization	Translation	Asterisms (Chinese name)	Romanization	Translation	Western star name	Proper Name	Chinese star name	Romanization	Translation
White Tiger of the West (西方白虎)	畢	Bì	Net	參旗	Sānqí	Banner of Three Stars					
White Tiger of the West (西方白虎)	畢	Bì	Net	參旗	Sānqí	Banner of Three Stars	ο^{1} Ori		參旗一	Sānqíyī	1st star
White Tiger of the West (西方白虎)	畢	Bì	Net	參旗	Sānqí	Banner of Three Stars	ο^{2} Ori		參旗二	Sānqíèr	2nd star
White Tiger of the West (西方白虎)	畢	Bì	Net	參旗	Sānqí	Banner of Three Stars	6 Ori		參旗三	Sānqísān	3rd star
White Tiger of the West (西方白虎)	畢	Bì	Net	參旗	Sānqí	Banner of Three Stars	π^{1} Ori		參旗四	Sānqísì	4th star
White Tiger of the West (西方白虎)	畢	Bì	Net	參旗	Sānqí	Banner of Three Stars	π^{2} Ori		參旗五	Sānqíwu	5th star
White Tiger of the West (西方白虎)	畢	Bì	Net	參旗	Sānqí	Banner of Three Stars	π^{3} Ori	Tabit	參旗六	Sānqíliù	6th star
White Tiger of the West (西方白虎)	畢	Bì	Net	參旗	Sānqí	Banner of Three Stars	π^{4} Ori				
White Tiger of the West (西方白虎)	畢	Bì	Net	參旗	Sānqí	Banner of Three Stars	π^{4} Ori		參旗七	Sānqíqī	7th star
White Tiger of the West (西方白虎)	畢	Bì	Net	參旗	Sānqí	Banner of Three Stars	π^{4} Ori		胃宿西南星	Wèixiùxīnánxīng	Star in the southwest of Stomach constellation
White Tiger of the West (西方白虎)	畢	Bì	Net	參旗	Sānqí	Banner of Three Stars	π^{5} Ori		參旗八	Sānqíbā	8th star
White Tiger of the West (西方白虎)	畢	Bì	Net	參旗	Sānqí	Banner of Three Stars	π^{6} Ori		參旗九	Sānqíjiǔ	9th star
White Tiger of the West (西方白虎)	畢	Bì	Net	參旗	Sānqí	Banner of Three Stars	11 Ori		參旗增四	Sānqízēngsì	4th additional star
White Tiger of the West (西方白虎)	畢	Bì	Net	參旗	Sānqí	Banner of Three Stars	15 Ori		參旗增五	Sānqízēngwǔ	5th additional star
White Tiger of the West (西方白虎)	畢	Bì	Net	參旗	Sānqí	Banner of Three Stars	18 Ori		參旗增六	Sānqízēngliù	6th additional star
White Tiger of the West (西方白虎)	畢	Bì	Net	參旗	Sānqí	Banner of Three Stars	16 Ori		參旗增七	Sānqízēngqī	7th additional star
White Tiger of the West (西方白虎)	畢	Bì	Net	參旗	Sānqí	Banner of Three Stars	13 Ori		參旗增八	Sānqízēngbā	8th additional star
White Tiger of the West (西方白虎)	畢	Bì	Net	參旗	Sānqí	Banner of Three Stars	14 Ori		參旗增十	Sānqízēngshí	10th additional star
White Tiger of the West (西方白虎)	畢	Bì	Net	參旗	Sānqí	Banner of Three Stars	5 Ori		參旗增十一	Sānqízēngshíyī	11th additional star
White Tiger of the West (西方白虎)	觜	Zī	Turtle Beak	觜	Zī	Turtle Beak					
White Tiger of the West (西方白虎)	觜	Zī	Turtle Beak	觜	Zī	Turtle Beak	λ Ori	Meissa (for componentA)			
White Tiger of the West (西方白虎)	觜	Zī	Turtle Beak	觜	Zī	Turtle Beak	λ Ori	Meissa (for componentA)	觜宿一	Zīxiùyī	1st star
White Tiger of the West (西方白虎)	觜	Zī	Turtle Beak	觜	Zī	Turtle Beak	λ Ori	Meissa (for componentA)	觜宿北星	Zīxiùyīběixīng	Northern star
White Tiger of the West (西方白虎)	觜	Zī	Turtle Beak	觜	Zī	Turtle Beak	λ Ori	Meissa (for componentA)	天船大星	Tiānchuándàxīng	Big star in Celestial Boat constellation
White Tiger of the West (西方白虎)	觜	Zī	Turtle Beak	觜	Zī	Turtle Beak	φ^{1} Ori				
White Tiger of the West (西方白虎)	觜	Zī	Turtle Beak	觜	Zī	Turtle Beak	φ^{1} Ori		觜宿二	Zīxiùèr	2nd star
White Tiger of the West (西方白虎)	觜	Zī	Turtle Beak	觜	Zī	Turtle Beak	φ^{1} Ori		觜宿距星	Zīxiùyījùxīng	Separated star
White Tiger of the West (西方白虎)	觜	Zī	Turtle Beak	觜	Zī	Turtle Beak	φ^{1} Ori		觜宿西南星	Zīxiùxīnánxīng	Southwestern star
White Tiger of the West (西方白虎)	觜	Zī	Turtle Beak	觜	Zī	Turtle Beak	φ^{2} Ori		觜宿三	Zīxiùsān	3rd star
White Tiger of the West (西方白虎)	觜	Zī	Turtle Beak	司怪	Sīguài	Deity in Charge of Monsters					
White Tiger of the West (西方白虎)	觜	Zī	Turtle Beak	司怪	Sīguài	Deity in Charge of Monsters	χ^{2} Ori		司怪三	Sīguàisān	3rd star
White Tiger of the West (西方白虎)	觜	Zī	Turtle Beak	司怪	Sīguài	Deity in Charge of Monsters	χ^{1} Ori		司怪四	Sīguàisì	4th star
White Tiger of the West (西方白虎)	觜	Zī	Turtle Beak	司怪	Sīguài	Deity in Charge of Monsters	104 Tau		司怪增一	Sīguàizēngyī	1st additional star
White Tiger of the West (西方白虎)	觜	Zī	Turtle Beak	司怪	Sīguài	Deity in Charge of Monsters	57 Ori		司怪增三	Sīguàizēngsān	3rd additional star
White Tiger of the West (西方白虎)	觜	Zī	Turtle Beak	司怪	Sīguài	Deity in Charge of Monsters	64 Ori		司怪增四	Sīguàizēngsì	4th additional star
White Tiger of the West (西方白虎)	觜	Zī	Turtle Beak	司怪	Sīguài	Deity in Charge of Monsters	68 Ori		司怪增五	Sīguàizēngwǔ	5th additional star
White Tiger of the West (西方白虎)	觜	Zī	Turtle Beak	司怪	Sīguài	Deity in Charge of Monsters	71 Ori		司怪增六	Sīguàizēngliù	6th additional star
White Tiger of the West (西方白虎)	參	Shēn	Three Stars	參	Shēn	Three Stars					
White Tiger of the West (西方白虎)	參	Shēn	Three Stars	參	Shēn	Three Stars	ζ Ori	Alnitak			
White Tiger of the West (西方白虎)	參	Shēn	Three Stars	參	Shēn	Three Stars	ζ Ori	Alnitak	參宿一	Shēnxiùyī	1st star
White Tiger of the West (西方白虎)	參	Shēn	Three Stars	參	Shēn	Three Stars	ζ Ori	Alnitak	參宿中央东星	Shēnxiùzhōngyāngdōngxīng	Center star
White Tiger of the West (西方白虎)	參	Shēn	Three Stars	參	Shēn	Three Stars	ζ Ori	Alnitak	昴宿西南星	Mǎoxiùxīnánxīng	Star in the southwest of Hairy Head constellation
White Tiger of the West (西方白虎)	參	Shēn	Three Stars	參	Shēn	Three Stars	ε Ori	Alnilam			
White Tiger of the West (西方白虎)	參	Shēn	Three Stars	參	Shēn	Three Stars	ε Ori	Alnilam	參宿二	Shēnxiùèr	2nd star
White Tiger of the West (西方白虎)	參	Shēn	Three Stars	參	Shēn	Three Stars	ε Ori	Alnilam	參宿中央中星	Shēnxiùzhōngyāngdōngxīng	Eastern star
White Tiger of the West (西方白虎)	參	Shēn	Three Stars	參	Shēn	Three Stars	ε Ori	Alnilam	天廪南星	Tiānyǔnánxīng	Star in the south of Ricks of Grain constellation
White Tiger of the West (西方白虎)	參	Shēn	Three Stars	參	Shēn	Three Stars	δ Ori	Mintaka			
White Tiger of the West (西方白虎)	參	Shēn	Three Stars	參	Shēn	Three Stars	δ Ori	Mintaka	參宿三	Shēnxiùsān	3rd star
White Tiger of the West (西方白虎)	參	Shēn	Three Stars	參	Shēn	Three Stars	δ Ori	Mintaka	參宿距星	Shēnxiùjùxīng	Separated star
White Tiger of the West (西方白虎)	參	Shēn	Three Stars	參	Shēn	Three Stars	δ Ori	Mintaka	參宿中央西星	Shēnxiùzhōngyāngxīxīng	Western star
White Tiger of the West (西方白虎)	參	Shēn	Three Stars	參	Shēn	Three Stars	δ Ori	Mintaka	传舍西第四星	Chuánshèxīdìsìxīng	4th star in the west of Guest House constellation
White Tiger of the West (西方白虎)	參	Shēn	Three Stars	參	Shēn	Three Stars	α Ori	Betelgeuse			
White Tiger of the West (西方白虎)	參	Shēn	Three Stars	參	Shēn	Three Stars	α Ori	Betelgeuse	參宿四	Shēnxiùsì	4th star
White Tiger of the West (西方白虎)	參	Shēn	Three Stars	參	Shēn	Three Stars	α Ori	Betelgeuse	参左肩	Shēnzuǒxīng	Left-side star
White Tiger of the West (西方白虎)	參	Shēn	Three Stars	參	Shēn	Three Stars	α Ori	Betelgeuse	左將軍	Zuǒjiāngjūn	Left-side general
White Tiger of the West (西方白虎)	參	Shēn	Three Stars	參	Shēn	Three Stars	α Ori	Betelgeuse	參宿东北星	Shēnxiùdōngběixīng	Northeastern star
White Tiger of the West (西方白虎)	參	Shēn	Three Stars	參	Shēn	Three Stars	α Ori	Betelgeuse	卷舌东大星	Shēnxiùdōngdàxīng	Big star in the east of Rolled Tongue constellation
White Tiger of the West (西方白虎)	參	Shēn	Three Stars	參	Shēn	Three Stars	γ Ori	Bellatrix			
White Tiger of the West (西方白虎)	參	Shēn	Three Stars	參	Shēn	Three Stars	γ Ori	Bellatrix	參宿五	Shēnxiùwu	5th star
White Tiger of the West (西方白虎)	參	Shēn	Three Stars	參	Shēn	Three Stars	γ Ori	Bellatrix	参右肩	Shēnyòuxīng	Right-side star
White Tiger of the West (西方白虎)	參	Shēn	Three Stars	參	Shēn	Three Stars	γ Ori	Bellatrix	右將軍	Yòujiāngjūn	Right-side general
White Tiger of the West (西方白虎)	參	Shēn	Three Stars	參	Shēn	Three Stars	γ Ori	Bellatrix	參宿西北星	Shēnxiùxīběixīng	Northwestern star
White Tiger of the West (西方白虎)	參	Shēn	Three Stars	參	Shēn	Three Stars	γ Ori	Bellatrix	大陵大星	Dàlíngdàxīng	Big star of Mausoleum constellation
White Tiger of the West (西方白虎)	參	Shēn	Three Stars	參	Shēn	Three Stars	κ Ori	Saiph			
White Tiger of the West (西方白虎)	參	Shēn	Three Stars	參	Shēn	Three Stars	κ Ori	Saiph	參宿六	Shēnxiùliù	6th star
White Tiger of the West (西方白虎)	參	Shēn	Three Stars	參	Shēn	Three Stars	κ Ori	Saiph	參宿东南星	Shēnxiùdōngnánxīng	Southeastern star
White Tiger of the West (西方白虎)	參	Shēn	Three Stars	參	Shēn	Three Stars	κ Ori	Saiph	偏將軍	Piānjiāngjūn	Assistant general
White Tiger of the West (西方白虎)	參	Shēn	Three Stars	參	Shēn	Three Stars	β Ori	Rigel			
White Tiger of the West (西方白虎)	參	Shēn	Three Stars	參	Shēn	Three Stars	β Ori	Rigel	參宿七	Shēnxiùqī	7th star
White Tiger of the West (西方白虎)	參	Shēn	Three Stars	參	Shēn	Three Stars	β Ori	Rigel	參宿西南星	Shēnxiùxīnánxīng	Southwestern star
White Tiger of the West (西方白虎)	參	Shēn	Three Stars	參	Shēn	Three Stars	β Ori	Rigel	前將軍	Qiánjiāngjūn	Leading general
White Tiger of the West (西方白虎)	參	Shēn	Three Stars	參	Shēn	Three Stars	σ Ori		參宿增一	Shēnxiùzēngyī	1st additional star
White Tiger of the West (西方白虎)	參	Shēn	Three Stars	參	Shēn	Three Stars	31 Ori		參宿增二	Shēnxiùzēngèr	2nd additional star
White Tiger of the West (西方白虎)	參	Shēn	Three Stars	參	Shēn	Three Stars	η Ori		參宿增三	Shēnxiùzēngsān	3rd additional star
White Tiger of the West (西方白虎)	參	Shēn	Three Stars	參	Shēn	Three Stars	27 Ori		參宿增四	Shēnxiùzēngsì	4th additional star
White Tiger of the West (西方白虎)	參	Shēn	Three Stars	參	Shēn	Three Stars	22 Ori		參宿增五	Shēnxiùzēngwǔ	5th additional star
White Tiger of the West (西方白虎)	參	Shēn	Three Stars	參	Shēn	Three Stars	ψ¹ Ori		參宿增六	Shēnxiùzēngliù	6th additional star
White Tiger of the West (西方白虎)	參	Shēn	Three Stars	參	Shēn	Three Stars	21 Ori		參宿增八	Shēnxiùzēngbā	8th additional star
White Tiger of the West (西方白虎)	參	Shēn	Three Stars	參	Shēn	Three Stars	ρ Ori		參宿增九	Shēnxiùzēngjiǔ	9th additional star
White Tiger of the West (西方白虎)	參	Shēn	Three Stars	參	Shēn	Three Stars	23 Ori		參宿增十	Shēnxiùzēngshí	10th additional star
White Tiger of the West (西方白虎)	參	Shēn	Three Stars	參	Shēn	Three Stars	ψ² Ori		參宿增十一	Shēnxiùzēngshíyī	11th additional star
White Tiger of the West (西方白虎)	參	Shēn	Three Stars	參	Shēn	Three Stars	33 Ori		參宿增十二	Shēnxiùzēngshíèr	12th additional star
White Tiger of the West (西方白虎)	參	Shēn	Three Stars	參	Shēn	Three Stars	32 Ori		參宿增十三	Shēnxiùzēngshísān	13th additional star
White Tiger of the West (西方白虎)	參	Shēn	Three Stars	參	Shēn	Three Stars	38 Ori		參宿增十四	Shēnxiùzēngshísì	14th additional star
White Tiger of the West (西方白虎)	參	Shēn	Three Stars	參	Shēn	Three Stars	ω Ori		參宿增十五	Shēnxiùzēngshíwǔ	15th additional star
White Tiger of the West (西方白虎)	參	Shēn	Three Stars	參	Shēn	Three Stars	51 Ori		參宿增十六	Shēnxiùzēngshíliù	16th additional star
White Tiger of the West (西方白虎)	參	Shēn	Three Stars	參	Shēn	Three Stars	52 Ori		參宿增十七	Shēnxiùzēngshíqī	17th additional star
White Tiger of the West (西方白虎)	參	Shēn	Three Stars	參	Shēn	Three Stars	μ Ori		參宿增十八	Shēnxiùzēngshíbā	18th additional star
White Tiger of the West (西方白虎)	參	Shēn	Three Stars	參	Shēn	Three Stars	63 Ori		參宿增十九	Shēnxiùzēngshíjiǔ	19th additional star
White Tiger of the West (西方白虎)	參	Shēn	Three Stars	參	Shēn	Three Stars	66 Ori		參宿增二十	Shēnxiùzēngèrshí	20th additional star
White Tiger of the West (西方白虎)	參	Shēn	Three Stars	參	Shēn	Three Stars	59 Ori		參宿增二十一	Shēnxiùzēngèrshíyī	21st additional star
White Tiger of the West (西方白虎)	參	Shēn	Three Stars	參	Shēn	Three Stars	56 Ori		參宿增二十二	Shēnxiùzēngèrshíèr	22nd additional star
White Tiger of the West (西方白虎)	參	Shēn	Three Stars	參	Shēn	Three Stars	HD 40657		參宿增二十三	Shēnxiùzēngèrshísān	23rd additional star
White Tiger of the West (西方白虎)	參	Shēn	Three Stars	參	Shēn	Three Stars	55 Ori		參宿增三十四	Shēnxiùzēngsānshísì	34th additional star
White Tiger of the West (西方白虎)	參	Shēn	Three Stars	參	Shēn	Three Stars	49 Ori		參宿增三十五	Shēnxiùzēngsānshíwǔ	35th additional star
White Tiger of the West (西方白虎)	參	Shēn	Three Stars	參	Shēn	Three Stars	υ Ori		參宿增三十六	Shēnxiùzēngsānshíliù	36th additional star
White Tiger of the West (西方白虎)	參	Shēn	Three Stars	參	Shēn	Three Stars	29 Ori		參宿增三十七	Shēnxiùzēngsānshíqī	37th additional star
White Tiger of the West (西方白虎)	參	Shēn	Three Stars	參	Shēn	Three Stars	HD 35007		參宿增三十九	Shēnxiùzēngsānshíjiǔ	39th additional star
White Tiger of the West (西方白虎)	參	Shēn	Three Stars	伐	Fá	Punishment					
White Tiger of the West (西方白虎)	參	Shēn	Three Stars	伐	Fá	Punishment	θ^{1} Ori		伐一	Fáyī	1st star
White Tiger of the West (西方白虎)	參	Shēn	Three Stars	伐	Fá	Punishment	θ^{2} Ori		伐二	Fáèr	2nd star
White Tiger of the West (西方白虎)	參	Shēn	Three Stars	伐	Fá	Punishment	υ Ori / ι Ori				
White Tiger of the West (西方白虎)	參	Shēn	Three Stars	伐	Fá	Punishment	υ Ori / ι Ori		伐三	Fásān	3rd star
White Tiger of the West (西方白虎)	參	Shēn	Three Stars	伐	Fá	Punishment	υ Ori / ι Ori		伐下星	Fáxiàxīng	Under punishment (star)
White Tiger of the West (西方白虎)	參	Shēn	Three Stars	伐	Fá	Punishment	45 Ori		伐增一	Fázēngyī	1st additional star
White Tiger of the West (西方白虎)	參	Shēn	Three Stars	玉井	Yùjǐng	Jade Well	τ Ori		玉井四	Yùjǐngsì	4th star
Vermilion Bird of the South (南方朱雀)	井	Jǐng	Well	水府	Shuǐfǔ	Irrigation Official					
Vermilion Bird of the South (南方朱雀)	井	Jǐng	Well	水府	Shuǐfǔ	Irrigation Official	ν Ori		水府一	Shuǐfǔyī	1st star
Vermilion Bird of the South (南方朱雀)	井	Jǐng	Well	水府	Shuǐfǔ	Irrigation Official	ξ Ori		水府二	Shuǐfǔèr	2nd star
Vermilion Bird of the South (南方朱雀)	井	Jǐng	Well	水府	Shuǐfǔ	Irrigation Official	72 Ori		水府三	Shuǐfǔsān	3rd star
Vermilion Bird of the South (南方朱雀)	井	Jǐng	Well	水府	Shuǐfǔ	Irrigation Official	69 Ori		水府四	Shuǐfǔsì	4th star
Vermilion Bird of the South (南方朱雀)	井	Jǐng	Well	水府	Shuǐfǔ	Irrigation Official	73 Ori		水府增六	Shuǐfǔzēngliù	6th additional star
Vermilion Bird of the South (南方朱雀)	井	Jǐng	Well	水府	Shuǐfǔ	Irrigation Official	74 Ori		水府增七	Shuǐfǔzēngqī	7th additional star
Vermilion Bird of the South (南方朱雀)	井	Jǐng	Well	水府	Shuǐfǔ	Irrigation Official	75 Ori		水府增八	Shuǐfǔzēngbā	8th additional star

== See also ==
- Traditional Chinese star names
- Chinese constellations
