= Pi Orionis =

- The π Orionis stars form an arc on the west (right) side of the constellation of Orion.

Pi Orionis (π Ori, π Orionis) is a group of fairly widely scattered stars in the constellation Orion that constitute the asterism Orion's Shield or Orion's Bow.

They form an exception to the general rule that stars that share the same Bayer designation are close together: π^{1} is nearly 9° north of π^{6} (Tau Eridani is an even more noteworthy example of this).

- π^{1} Ori (7 Orionis)
- π^{2} Ori (2 Orionis)
- π^{3} Ori (1 Orionis)
- π^{4} Ori (3 Orionis)
- π^{5} Ori (8 Orionis, forms a visual double with 5 Orionis)
- π^{6} Ori (10 Orionis)

All of them were member of asterism 參旗 (Shēn Qí), Banner of Three Stars, Net mansion.

== See also ==
- Orion's Belt
- Orion's Sword
