= F Orionis =

The Bayer designation f Orionis is shared by two star systems in the constellation Orion:

- f^{1} Orionis (69 Orionis)
- f^{2} Orionis (72 Orionis)
