= Nu Boötis =

Location of the ν Boötis pair (circled)

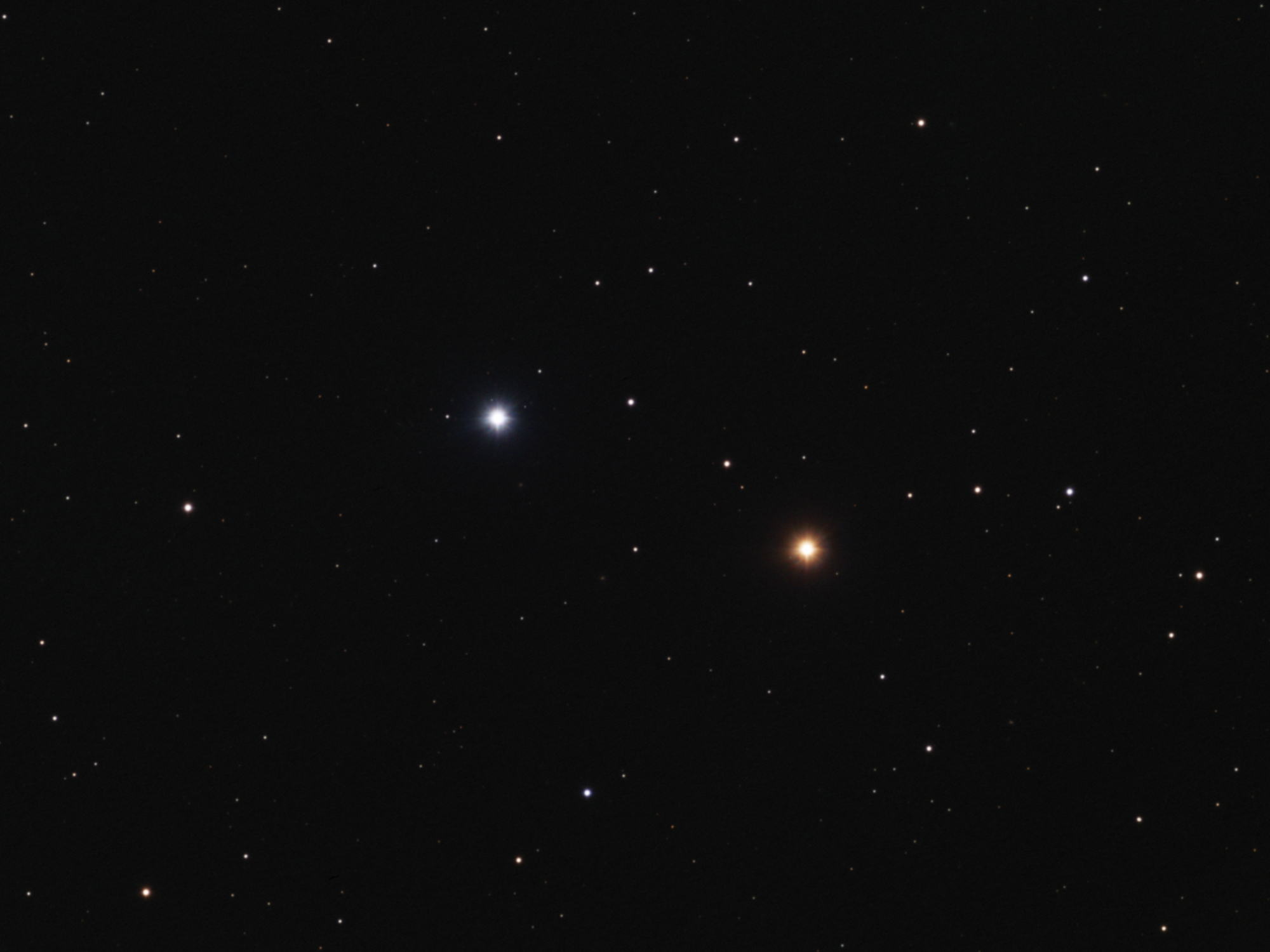
ν Boötis in optical light. ν^{2} is the blue-white star to the left. ν^{1} is the orange star to the right.

The Bayer designation Nu Boötis (ν Boo / ν Boötis) is shared by two star systems, in the constellation Boötes:

- ν^{1} Boötis
- ν^{2} Boötis

They are separated by 0.175° on the sky. They have almost identical visual magnitudes, but contrasting colours: ν^{1} is a yellow giant star, while ν^{2} is a close binary with two white main sequence stars.

Both stars were members of asterism 七公 (Qī Gōng), Seven Excellencies, Heavenly Market enclosure.

Ptolemy considered Nu Boötis to be shared by Hercules, and Bayer assigned it a designation in both constellations: Nu Boötis (ν Boo) and Psi Herculis (ψ Her). When the modern constellation boundaries were fixed in 1930, the latter designation dropped from use.
