= Kappa Ceti =

The Bayer designation κ Ceti (Kappa Ceti) is shared by two stars in the constellation of Cetus:

- Kappa^{1} Ceti: a yellow dwarf star approximately 29 light-years away.
- Kappa^{2} Ceti: a yellow giant star ten times as distant.

This optical system was designated as g Tauri by mistake, naturally it has been dropped.
