= 69 Orionis =

Star in the constellation Orion

- Location of 69 Orionis (circled)

Observation data Epoch J2000 Equinox ICRS
- Constellation: Orion
- Right ascension: 06^{h} 12^{m} 03.27955^{s}
- Declination: +16° 07′ 49.4614″
- Apparent magnitude (V): 4.92

Characteristics
- Evolutionary stage: main sequence
- Spectral type: B5Vn
- U−B color index: −0.59
- B−V color index: −0.12

Astrometry
Radial velocity (R_{v})	+22.00 km/s
Proper motion (μ)	RA: +5.49 mas/yr Dec.: −16.80 mas/yr
Parallax (π)	6.17±0.25 mas
Distance	530 ± 20 ly (162 ± 7 pc)
Absolute magnitude (M_{V})	−1.09

Details
Mass	6.4±0.2 M_{☉}
Radius	3.4 R_{☉}
Luminosity	1,442+248 −212 L_{☉}
Surface gravity (log g)	4.05±0.17 cgs
Temperature	17,090 K
Metallicity [Fe/H]	+0.01 dex
Rotational velocity (v sin i)	285±23 km/s
Age	10–40 Myr

Other designations
- f^{1} Ori, 69 Ori, BD+16°1035, GC 7891, HD 42545, HIP 29434, HR 2198, SAO 95365

Database references
SIMBAD	data

69 Orionis is a single star in the equatorial constellation of Orion, positioned a couple of degrees to the north of Xi Orionis. It has the Bayer designation f^{1} Orionis; 69 Orionis is the Flamsteed designation. The star is visible to the naked eye as faint, blue-white hued point of light with an apparent visual magnitude of 4.92. It is located approximately 530 light-years from the Sun based on parallax, and is drifting further away with a radial velocity of +22 km/s. In 2015, H. Bouy and J. Alves suggested that it is a member of the newly discovered Taurion OB association.

This object is a B-type main-sequence star with a stellar classification of B5Vn, where the 'n' suffix indicates "nebulous" (broad) lines due to rapid rotation. It has a projected rotational velocity of 285 km/s, compared to a critical velocity of 476±37 km/s; the polar axis is inclined by 64°±16°. This is a known Be star that began behaving as a normal star in November, 1982. It has 6.4 times the mass of the Sun and is radiating around 1,442 times the Sun's luminosity from its photosphere at an effective temperature of 17,090 K.
