= Xi Orionis =

Binary star system in the constellation Orion

ξ Orionis
- Location of ξ Orionis (circled)

Observation data Epoch J2000.0 Equinox J2000.0 (ICRS)
- Constellation: Orion
- Right ascension: 06^{h} 11^{m} 56.39693^{s}
- Declination: +14° 12′ 31.5555″
- Apparent magnitude (V): 4.47

Characteristics
- Spectral type: B3 IV
- U−B color index: −0.65
- B−V color index: −0.19

Astrometry
Radial velocity (R_{v})	+19.30 km/s
Proper motion (μ)	RA: +0.29 mas/yr Dec.: −20.12 mas/yr
Parallax (π)	5.37±0.23 mas
Distance	610 ± 30 ly (186 ± 8 pc)

Orbit
Period (P)	45.1 d
Eccentricity (e)	0.26
Periastron epoch (T)	2,441,962.3 JD
Argument of periastron (ω) (secondary)	205°
Semi-amplitude (K_{1}) (primary)	22.4 km/s

Details

ξ Ori A
Mass	6.7±0.1 M_{☉}
Luminosity	1,390 L_{☉}
Temperature	15,476 K
Rotational velocity (v sin i)	160 km/s
Age	32.1±4.3 Myr

Other designations
- ξ Ori, 70 Orionis, BD+14°1187, HD 42560, HIP 29426, HR 2199, SAO 95362

Database references
SIMBAD	data

Xi Orionis (ξ Orionis) is a binary star system in the northeastern part of the constellation of Orion, well above the red giant star Betelgeuse in the sky. It lies next to another blue main-sequence star, Nu Orionis, which is somewhat closer at 520 light-years' distance. The apparent visual magnitude of Xi Orionis is 4.47, which is bright enough to be seen with the naked eye. The distance to this star, as determined using the parallax method, is roughly 610 light-years.

This is a spectroscopic binary star system with an orbital period of 45.1 days and an eccentricity of 0.26. The primary component is a B-type subgiant star with a stellar classification of B3 IV. With an estimated age of just 32 million years, it has a relatively high rate of spin, showing a projected rotational velocity of 160 km/s. Xi Orionis has about 6.7 times the mass of the Sun, and shines with 1,390 times the solar luminosity from its outer atmosphere at an effective temperature of 15,476 K.
