= Nu Orionis =

Binary star system in the constellation Orion

ν Orionis
- Location of ν Orionis (circled)

Observation data Epoch J2000.0 Equinox J2000.0 (ICRS)
- Constellation: Orion
- Right ascension: 06^{h} 07^{m} 34.32588^{s}
- Declination: +14° 46′ 06.5061″
- Apparent magnitude (V): 4.42

Characteristics
- Spectral type: B3 V or B3 IV
- U−B color index: −0.67
- B−V color index: −0.18

Astrometry
Radial velocity (R_{v})	+24.1 km/s
Proper motion (μ)	RA: +6.78 mas/yr Dec.: −20.23 mas/yr
Parallax (π)	6.32±0.33 mas
Distance	520 ± 30 ly (158 ± 8 pc)

Orbit
Period (P)	131.211 d
Eccentricity (e)	0.64
Periastron epoch (T)	2436475.852 JD
Argument of periastron (ω) (secondary)	6.6°
Semi-amplitude (K_{1}) (primary)	33.3 km/s

Details

ν Ori A
Mass	6.7±0.1 M_{☉}
Radius	4.3 R_{☉}
Luminosity	1,965 L_{☉}
Surface gravity (log g)	4.06 cgs
Temperature	17,880 K
Metallicity [Fe/H]	−0.05 dex
Rotational velocity (v sin i)	30 km/s
Age	26.3±5.3 Myr

Other designations
- ν Ori, 67 Ori, BD+14°1152, FK5 232, HD 41753, HIP 29038, HR 2159, SAO 95259

Database references
SIMBAD	data

Nu Orionis (ν Orionis) is a binary star system in the northeastern part of the constellation Orion. It should not be confused with the variable star NU Orionis. Nu Orionis has an apparent visual magnitude of 4.42, which is bright enough to be seen with the naked eye. Based upon an annual parallax shift of 0.00632 arcseconds, the distance to this system is roughly 520 light years.

This is a single-lined spectroscopic binary system, which means that only the absorption line features of one of the components can be distinguished. The components orbit each other with a period of 131.2 days and an eccentricity of 0.64. Depending on the source, the primary is either a B-type main sequence star with a stellar classification of B3 V, or a more evolved B-type subgiant star of class B3 IV. It has an angular diameter of 0.251 mas, which, at the estimated distance of this system, yields a physical size of about 4.3 times the radius of the Sun. The mass is 6.7 times that of the Sun and it shines with 1,965 times the solar luminosity from its outer atmosphere at an effective temperature of 17,880 K.
