= HR 3803 =

Star in the constellation Vela

- Location of N Velorum (circled in red)

Observation data Epoch J2000 Equinox ICRS
- Constellation: Vela
- Right ascension: 09^{h} 31^{m} 13.31815^{s}
- Declination: −57° 02′ 03.7552″
- Apparent magnitude (V): 3.16

Characteristics
- Spectral type: K5 III
- U−B color index: +1.88
- B−V color index: +1.55

Astrometry
Radial velocity (R_{v})	−13.9 km/s
Proper motion (μ)	RA: −32.615 mas/yr Dec.: +5.857 mas/yr
Parallax (π)	14.6234±0.1858 mas
Distance	223 ± 3 ly (68.4 ± 0.9 pc)
Absolute magnitude (M_{V})	−1.16

Details
Mass	2.1±0.3 M_{☉}
Radius	66±5 R_{☉}
Luminosity	776 L_{☉}
Surface gravity (log g)	1.19±0.02 cgs
Temperature	3,964±125 K

Other designations
- N Velorum, N Vel, CP−56 2270, HD 82668, FK5 361, HIP 46701, HR 3803, SAO 237067

Database references
SIMBAD	data

HR 3803 or N Velorum (N Vel) is a 3rd-magnitude star on the border between the southern constellations Carina and Vela. Based upon parallax measurements, it is approximately 223 light-years (68 parsecs) from Earth.

It has a spectral classificafion of K5III, indicating that it has evolved from the main sequence and is now a giant star. At this evolutionary stage, N Velorum has expanded to 66 times the size of the Sun and is emitting 776 times its luminosity. Its effective temperature is of 3,964 K, 30% cooler than the Sun, which gives it the typical orange hue of K-type stars.

In 1752, French astronomer Nicolas Louis de Lacaille divided the former constellation Argo Navis into three separate constellations, and then referenced its stars by extending Bayer's system of star nomenclature; this star was given the designation N Velorum. In 1871 Benjamin Apthorp Gould discovered this star to be variable, but this occurred prior to the standardization of variable star nomenclature by German astronomer Friedrich Wilhelm Argelander during the nineteenth century, so it does not fall into the standard range of variable star designations.
