= Omicron Scorpii =

Star in the constellation Scorpius

ο Scorpii
- Location of ο Scorpii (circled in red)

Observation data Epoch J2000 Equinox ICRS
- Constellation: Scorpius
- Right ascension: 16^{h} 20^{m} 38.18068^{s}
- Declination: −24° 10′ 09.5491″
- Apparent magnitude (V): +4.57

Characteristics
- Spectral type: A4II/III
- B−V color index: 0.5125

Astrometry
| Radial velocity (R_{v}) | −8.2 km/s |
| Proper motion (μ) | RA: −4.32 mas/yr Dec.: −14.15 mas/yr |
| Parallax (π) | 3.71±0.54 mas |
| Distance | approx. 900 ly (approx. 270 pc) |
| Absolute magnitude (M_{V}) | −4.0 |

Details
| Mass | 7.9±0.1 M_{☉} |
| Radius | 15 R_{☉} |
| Luminosity | 3,162 L_{☉} |
| Surface gravity (log g) | 2.42 cgs |
| Temperature | 8,128 K |
| Rotational velocity (v sin i) | 23 km/s |
| Age | 39.8±4.9 Myr |

Other designations
- ο Sco, 19 Scorpii, CD−23°12849, HD 147084, HIP 80079, HR 6081, SAO 184329.

Database references
| SIMBAD | data |

Omicron Scorpii (ο Sco, ο Scorpii) is a star in the zodiac constellation of Scorpius. With an apparent visual magnitude of +4.57, it is visible to the naked eye. Parallax measurements indicate a distance of roughly 900 light years. It is located in the proximity of the Rho Ophiuchi dark cloud.

This is a white A-type bright giant with a stellar classification of A4II/III. It is one of the brighter members of this rare class of stars, making it of interest for study. Omicron Scorpii has about eight times the mass of the Sun, fifteen times the radius, and is roughly 40 million years old. The star is radiating around 3,200 times the luminosity of the Sun from its outer atmosphere at an effective temperature of about 8,128 K. It does not display an infrared excess due to circumstellar dust or a possible infrared-bright companion, but the light from this star is subject to extinction from interstellar dust.

This star was originally designated by Lacaille as o Scorpii (lowercase Latin o) instead of omicron, but this designation was reinterpreted as Omicron Scorpii when the star originally designated by Bayer as Omicron Scorpii was reassigned to Libra as Upsilon Librae.

Omicron Scorpii was occasionally mentioned as a possible member of the Upper Scorpius sub-group in the Scorpius–Centaurus OB association during the 20th century. However, it does not appear in more recent membership lists for this group due to its small proper motion and small trigonometric parallax as measured by Hipparcos. This suggests that it is a background star unrelated to Scorpius–Centaurus.
