= Upsilon Orionis =

Star in the constellation Orion

υ Orionis
- Location of υ Orionis (circled)

Observation data Epoch J2000.0 Equinox ICRS
- Constellation: Orion
- Right ascension: 05^{h} 31^{m} 55.85996^{s}
- Declination: −07° 18′ 05.5359″
- Apparent magnitude (V): +4.618±0.013

Characteristics
- Spectral type: O9.7V
- U−B color index: −1.068±0.008
- B−V color index: −0.264±0.007
- Variable type: suspected β Cep

Astrometry
Radial velocity (R_{v})	+17.4 km/s
Proper motion (μ)	RA: −0.704 mas/yr Dec.: −4.885 mas/yr
Parallax (π)	2.4567±0.1403 mas
Distance	1,260±75 ly (386±23 pc)
Absolute magnitude (M_{V})	−3.45±0.09

Details
Mass	17.5±0.5 M_{☉}
Radius	5.5±0.3 R_{☉}
Luminosity	32,360+2,310 −2,160 L_{☉}
Luminosity (visual, L_{V})	2,050 (Note: Calculated using the visual absolute magnitude of Thabit, with respect to the solar absolute magnitude of +4.83: 10^{0.4(4.74−(−3.45))} = 2,051.16.) L_{☉}
Surface gravity (log g)	4.20±0.05 cgs
Temperature	33,400±200 K
Metallicity [Fe/H]	+0.0018 dex
Rotational velocity (v sin i)	20±2 km/s
Age	4.5 Myr

Other designations
- Thabit, υ Ori, 36 Orionis, HD 36512, HIP 25923, HR 1855, SAO 132222, BD−07°1106

Database references
SIMBAD	data

Upsilon Orionis (υ Ori, υ Orionis) is a star in the constellation Orion. It has the traditional name Thabit /ˈθeɪbɪt/ or Tabit (ﺛﺎﺑﺖ, Arabic for "the endurer"), a name shared with Pi^{3} Orionis. It is a blue-white main sequence star of apparent magnitude 4.62 located over 1,300 light-years distant from the Solar System. It is a suspected Beta Cephei variable.

== Name ==
Located south of Iota Orionis, Upsilon Orionis is one of two stars (the other is 29 Orionis) marking the top of Orion's right boot in Johann Bayer's Uranometria (1603). It was given the number 36 by John Flamsteed, while its proper name appears to be derived from the Arabic Al Thabit "the endurer". In his Star-Names and Their Meanings (1899), American amateur naturalist Richard Hinckley Allen noted that the name appeared on the star atlas Geography of the Heavens, composed by Elijah Hinsdale Burritt, but its ultimate origin was unknown.

== Properties ==
Since 1943, this star has been consistently defined as a B0 main sequence star used as a reference for classifying the spectra of other stars on the MK scale, although in other studies it has been classified as O9V and O9.5V. The Galactic O-Star Spectroscopic Survey defined it as the standard star for the O9.7V spectral type in 2011.

In a 1981 paper, Thabit was observed to have nonradial pulsations over a period of around 12 hours, and has been classified as a slowly pulsating B star. Subsequent review of Hipparcos catalog data indicated it was most likely a Beta Cephei variable, and is hence considered a candidate for that class. These are blue-white main sequence stars of around 10 to 20 times the mass of the Sun that pulsate with periods of 0.1 to 0.3 days; their changes in magnitude are much more pronounced in the ultraviolet than in the visual spectrum. It is classified as a Beta Cephei variable by the American Association of Variable Star Observers, and has an apparent magnitude of +4.62.

Thabit's parallax has been measured at 2.46±0.14 mas, yielding a distance of approximately 1,325 light years from Earth. Spectroscopic observations found it to be 1,260 light-years distant, with a radius 5.5 and a luminosity 32,000 that of the Sun, an effective temperature of 32,900 K and a mass 17.5 that of the Sun. It is one of the most massive stars of the Orion OB1c association (in Orion's Sword).
