= Messier 43 =

Emission nebula in the constellation Orion

Emission nebula
- H II region
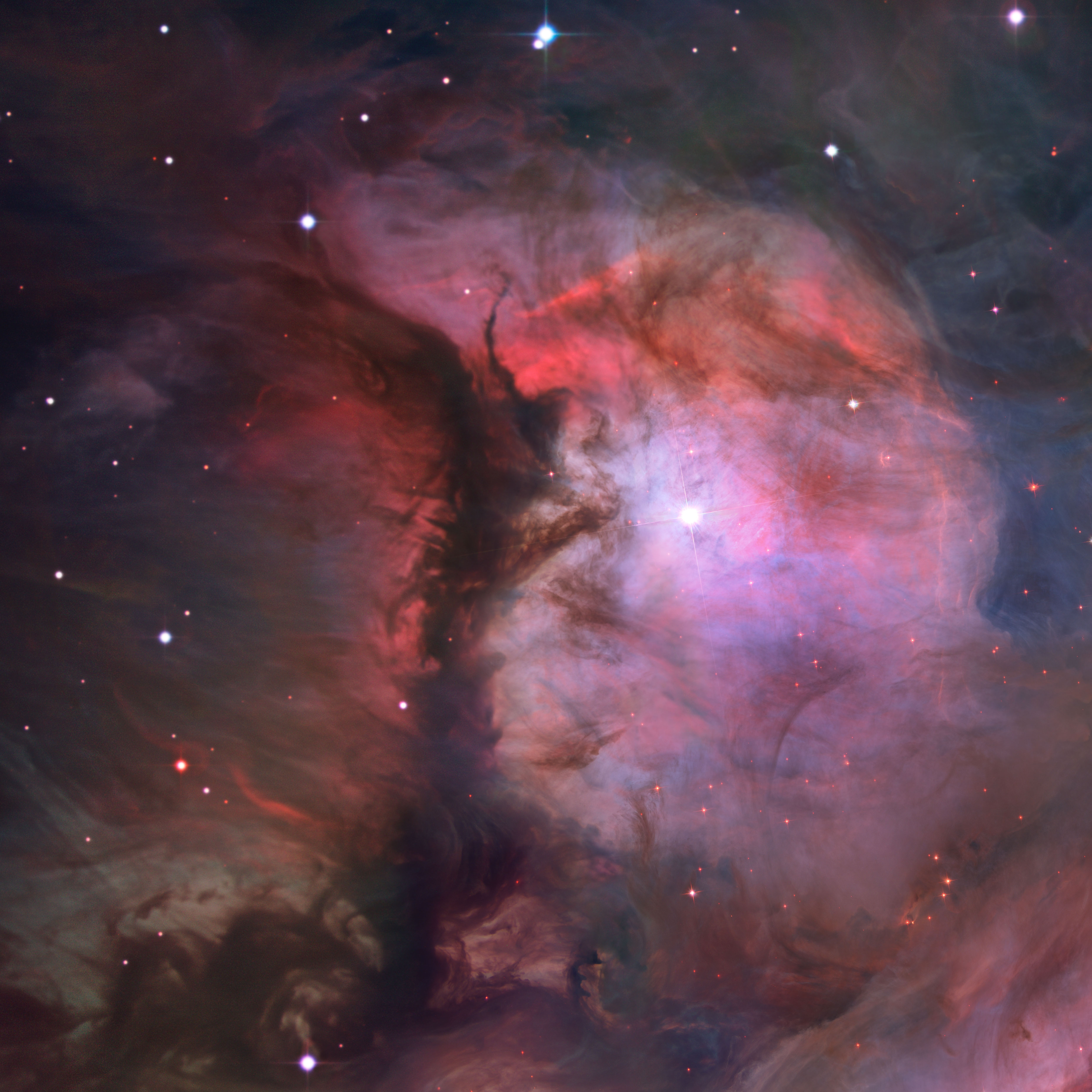
- Hubble Space Telescope view of M43

Observation data: J2000 epoch
- Right ascension: 05^{h} 35^{m} 31.8^{s}
- Declination: −05° 17′ 57″
- Distance: 1,300 ± 160 ly (400 ± 50 pc) ly
- Apparent magnitude (V): 9.0
- Apparent dimensions (V): 20′ × 15′
- Constellation: Orion
- Notable features: NU Orionis
- Designations: De Mairan's Nebula, M43, NGC 1982

Messier 43 or M43, also known as De Mairan's Nebula and NGC 1982, is a star-forming nebula with a prominent H II region in the equatorial constellation of Orion. It was discovered by the French scientist Jean-Jacques d'Ortous de Mairan some time before 1731, then catalogued by Charles Messier in 1769. (Note: On March 4) It is physically part of the Orion Nebula (Messier 42), separate from that main nebula by a dense lane of dust known as the northeast dark lane. It is part of the much larger Orion molecular cloud complex.

The main ionizing star in this nebula is the quadruple star system NU Orionis (HD 37061), the focus of the H II region, 1,360 ± 30 ly (417.0 ± 9.2 pc) away. This star system is not hot enough to produce significant amounts of [O III] emission, unlike the Trapezium in the Orion Nebula.

The H II region is a roundish volume of ionized hydrogen. It has a diameter of about 4.5′, at its distance meaning it measures 2.1 ly (0.65 pc). The net (meaning omitting the star) hydrogen alpha luminosity of this region is (3.0±1.1)×10^{35} erg s^{−1}; equivalent to 78 L_{☉}. There is a dark lane crossing the whole west-centre strip from north to south, known as the M43 dark lane, which forming a swirling belt extension to the south links to Orion's northeast dark lane. All of these resemble a mixture of smoke rising from a chimney and in watercolour broad and fine dark brushstrokes, at many wavelengths.

== Gallery ==
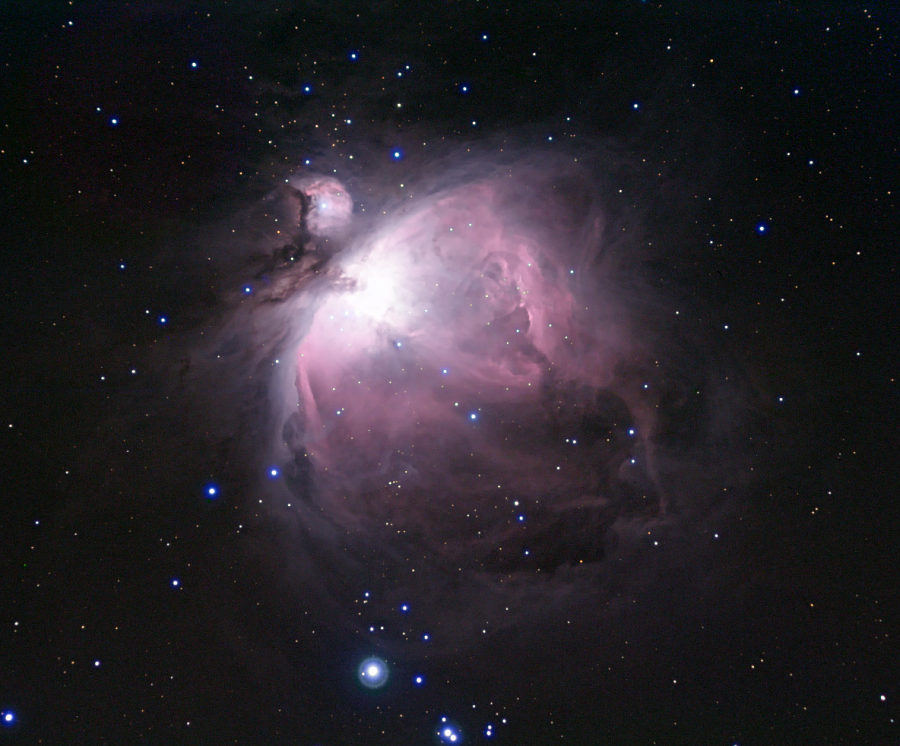
Emission nebula Messier 43 to the northeast of the well-known M42 Orion Nebula

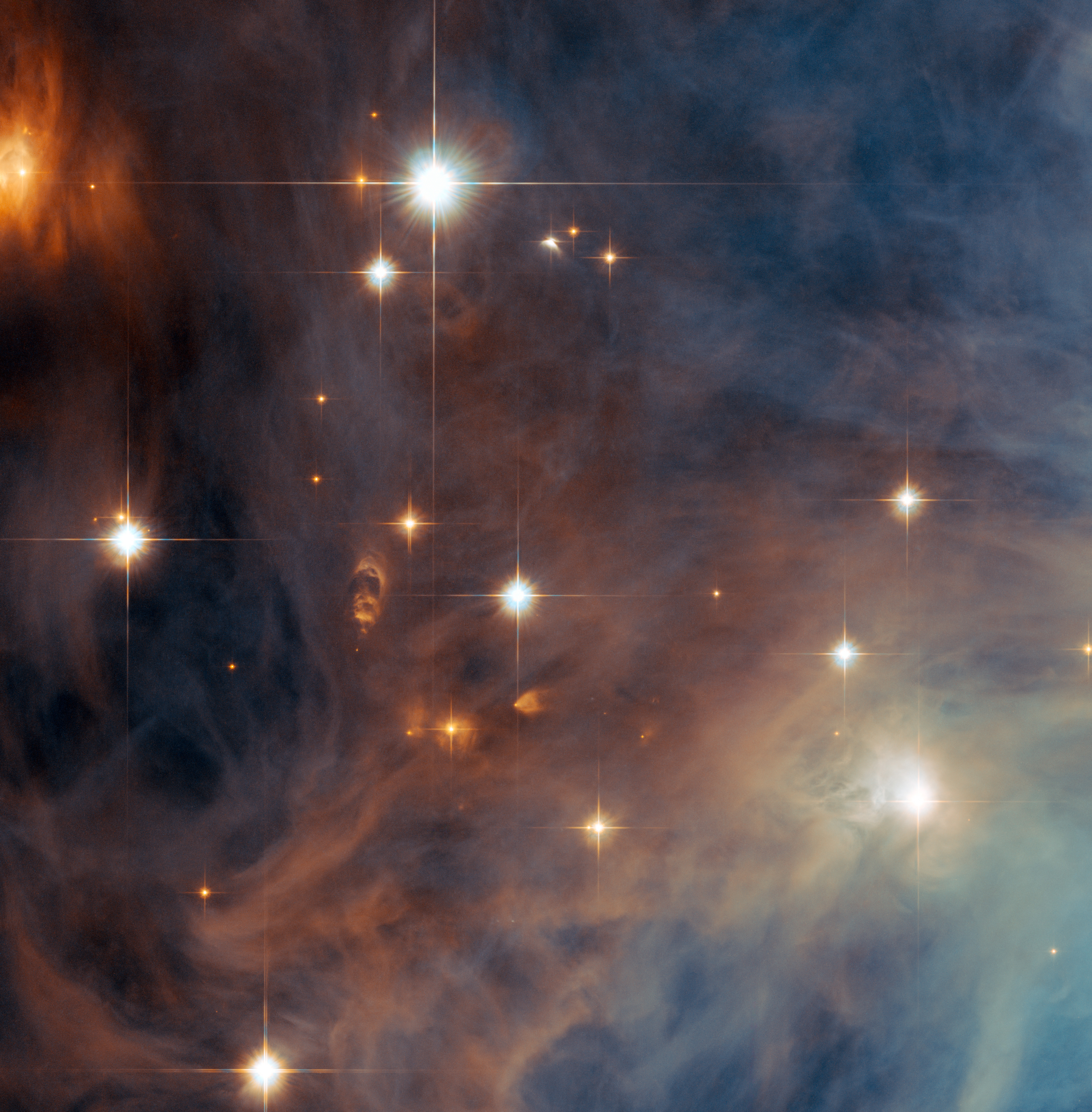
Infrared view of (part of) De Mairan's Nebula (M43)

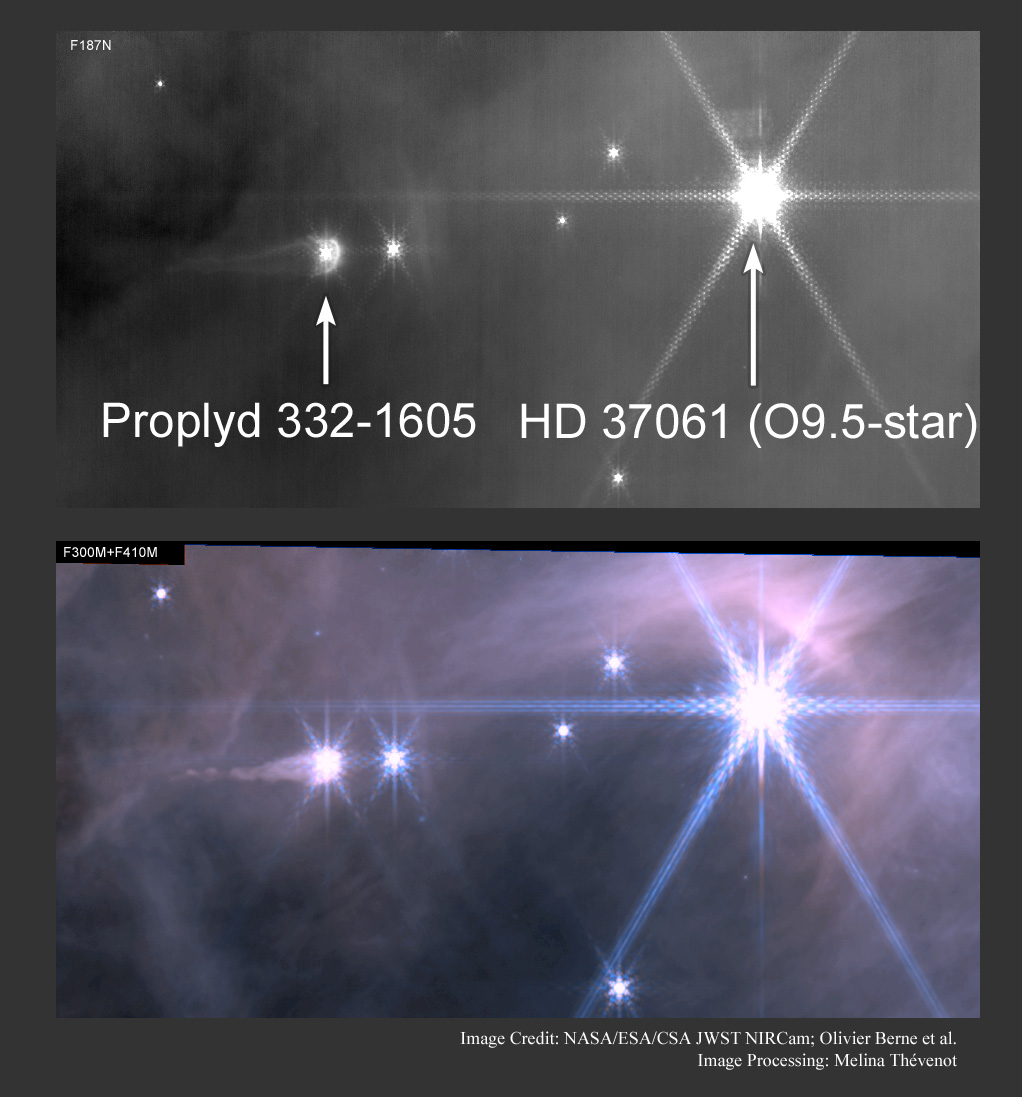
A proplyd being ionized by HD 37061 (image with JWST).

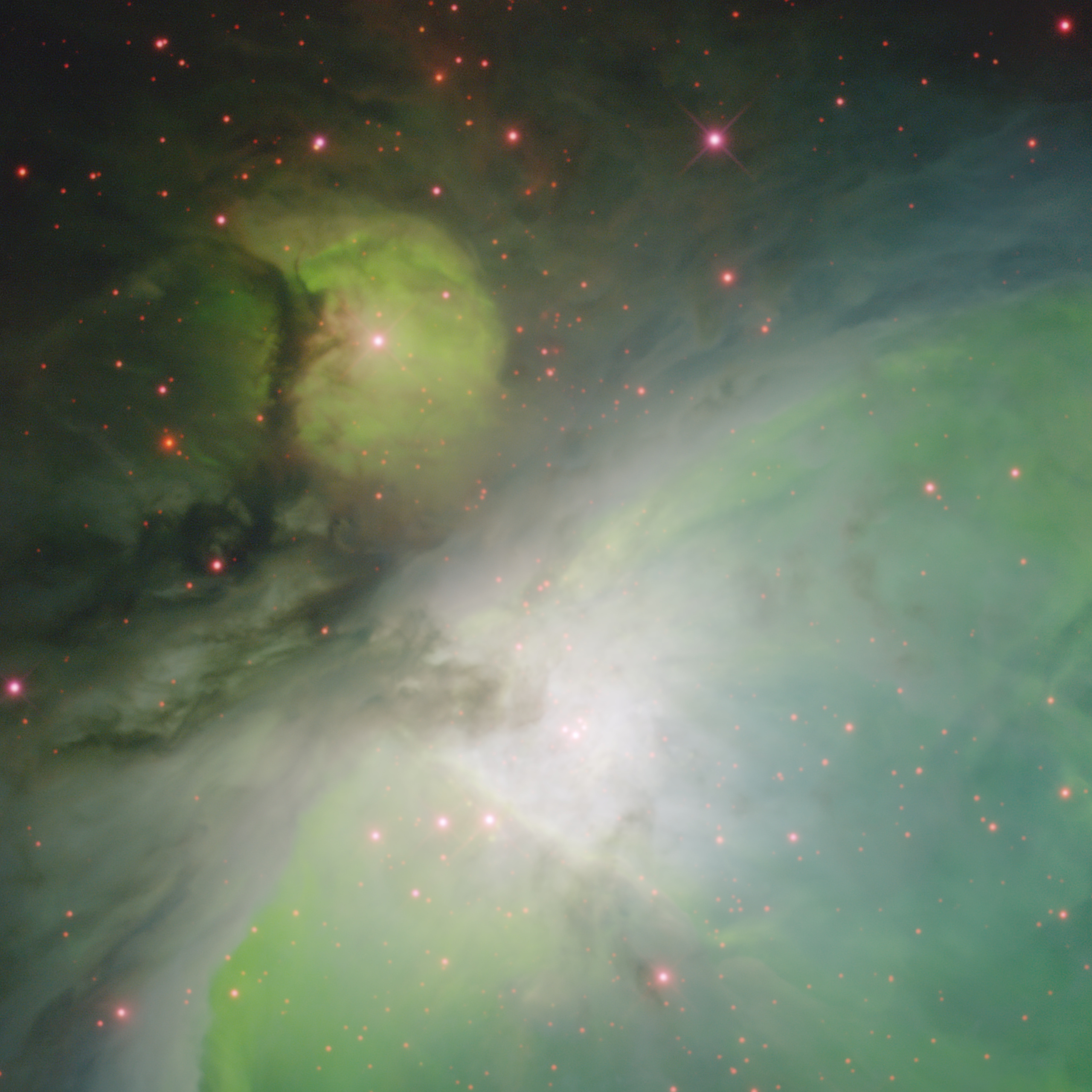
In this false color image, M43 visibly lacks [O III] emission (blue) present throughout the rest of the Orion Nebula.

== See also ==
- List of Messier objects
