= 29 Orionis =

Aging giant star in the constellation of Orion

- Location of 29 Orionis (circled)

Observation data Epoch J2000 Equinox ICRS
- Constellation: Orion
- Right ascension: 05^{h} 23^{m} 56.82768^{s}
- Declination: −07° 48′ 29.0332″
- Apparent magnitude (V): 4.13

Characteristics
- Spectral type: G8IIIFe-0.5
- U−B color index: +0.70
- B−V color index: +0.96

Astrometry
Radial velocity (R_{v})	−17.68 km/s
Proper motion (μ)	RA: −14.82 mas/yr Dec.: −45.02 mas/yr
Parallax (π)	20.73±0.17 mas
Distance	157 ± 1 ly (48.2 ± 0.4 pc)
Absolute magnitude (M_{V})	0.73

Details
Mass	1.82±0.08 M_{☉}
Radius	11.53±0.09 R_{☉}
Luminosity	70±1 L_{☉}
Surface gravity (log g)	2.76±0.21 cgs
Temperature	4,920±20 K
Metallicity [Fe/H]	−0.18±0.02 dex
Rotational velocity (v sin i)	1.1 km/s
Age	1.42±0.12 Gyr

Other designations
- e Ori, 29 Ori, BD−07°1064, GC 6646, HD 35369, HIP 25247, HR 1784, SAO 132067

Database references
SIMBAD	data

29 Orionis is a single star located around 157 light years away from the Sun in the equatorial constellation of Orion. In Bayer's Uranometria, this star is one of two stars (the other being Upsilon Orionis) marking the top of Orion's right boot. It has the Bayer designation e Orionis, while 29 Orionis is the Flamsteed designation. This object is visible to the naked eye as a faint, yellow-hued point of light with an apparent visual magnitude of 4.13. It is moving closer to the Earth with a heliocentric radial velocity of -18 km/s.

This is an aging giant star with a stellar classification of G8IIIFe-0.5, having exhausted the supply of hydrogen at its core and evolved away from the main sequence. The suffix notation indicates a mild underabundance of iron in the spectrum. It is a red clump giant, which means it is on the horizontal branch and is generating energy through helium fusion at its core. The star is 1.42 billion years old, has 1.82 times the mass of the Sun and has expanded to 11.53 times the Sun's radius. It is radiating 70 times the Sun's luminosity from its enlarged photosphere at an effective temperature of 4,920 K.
