= NU Orionis =

Quadruple star system in the constellation Orion

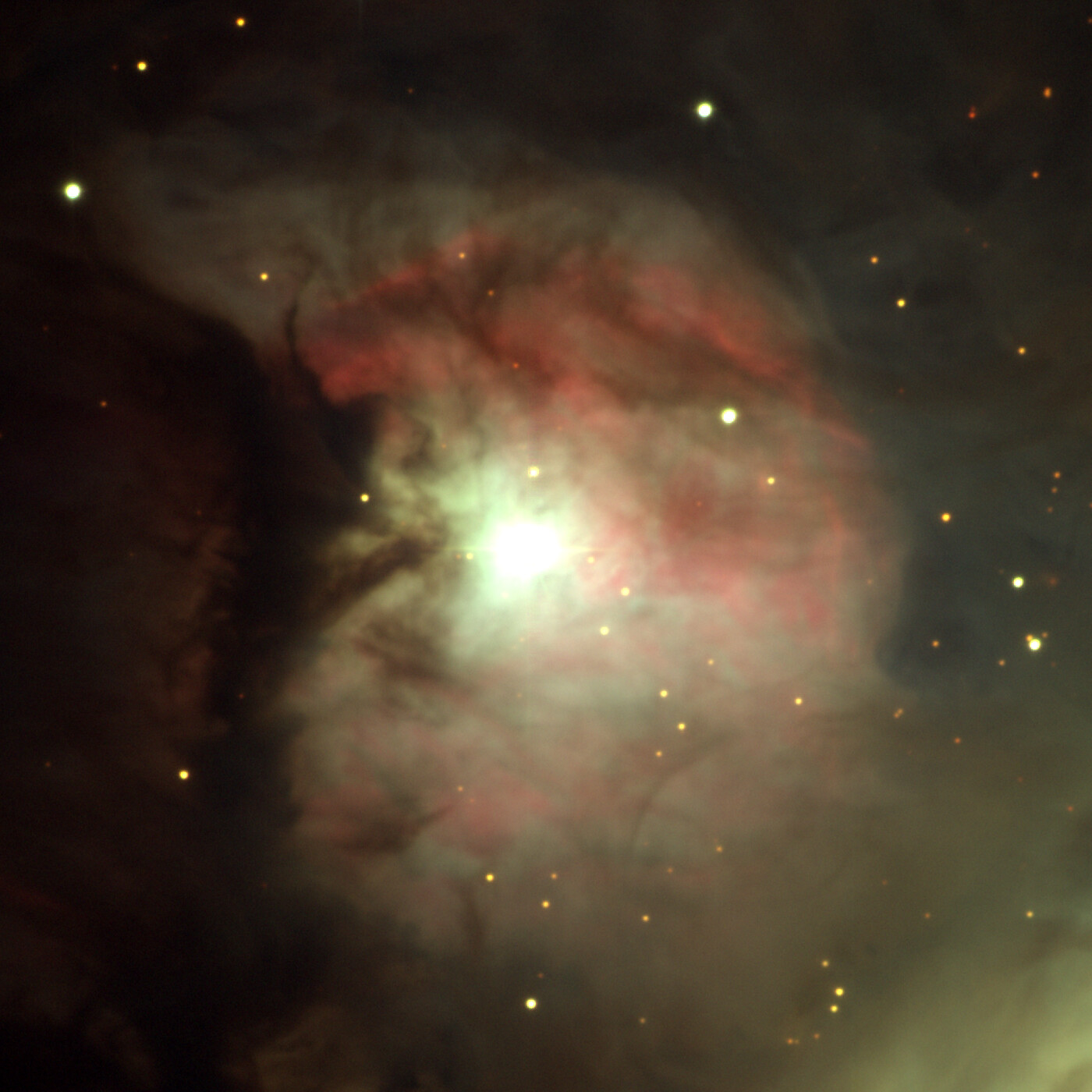
- Image of Messier 43, with NU Orionis in the center

Observation data Epoch J2000 Equinox ICRS
- Constellation: Orion
- Right ascension: 05^{h} 35^{m} 31.3649^{s}
- Declination: −05° 16′ 02.582″
- Apparent magnitude (V): +6.80–6.93

Characteristics
- Spectral type: B0.5V (Aa) + A/B (B) + B2V (C)
- Variable type: INSA

Astrometry
Radial velocity (R_{v})	67±1 km/s
Proper motion (μ)	RA: +0.922 mas/yr Dec.: +1.718 mas/yr
Parallax (π)	2.4059±0.0585 mas
Distance	1,360 ± 30 ly (420 ± 10 pc)

Orbit
Primary	Aa
Secondary	Ab
Period (P)	14.3027(7) days
Semi-major axis (a)	0.36±0.01 au
Eccentricity (e)	<0.02
Inclination (i)	70±4°
Periastron epoch (T)	2,440,578.5(5) JD
Semi-amplitude (K_{1}) (primary)	50±8 km/s
Semi-amplitude (K_{2}) (secondary)	172±3 km/s

Orbit
Primary	A
Secondary	C
Period (P)	1.30±0.01 yr
Semi-major axis (a)	3.64±0.04 au
Eccentricity (e)	0.246±0.050
Inclination (i)	110.4±4.1°
Longitude of the node (Ω)	85.6±4.2°
Periastron epoch (T)	2,456,026.5±13.7 JD
Argument of periastron (ω) (secondary)	94.9±8.4°
Semi-amplitude (K_{1}) (primary)	21±4 km/s
Semi-amplitude (K_{2}) (secondary)	47±6 km/s

Position (relative to AC)
Component	B
Epoch of observation	1999
Angular distance	470 mas
Projected separation	195±4 AU

Details

Aa
Mass	16.4±0.4 M_{☉}
Radius	5.7±0.3 R_{☉}
Luminosity	26,900 L_{☉}
Surface gravity (log g)	4.15±0.05 cgs
Temperature	31,100±500 K
Rotational velocity (v sin i)	190±20 km/s
Age	3+2 −1 Myr

Ab
Mass	4.4±0.2 M_{☉}
Radius	2.5±0.3 R_{☉}
Luminosity	350 L_{☉}
Surface gravity (log g)	4.28±0.10 cgs
Temperature	15,700±500 K
Rotational velocity (v sin i)	8±3 km/s
Age	3+2 −1 Myr

B
Mass	3.8 M_{☉}
Radius	2.3 R_{☉}
Luminosity	190 L_{☉}
Surface gravity (log g)	4.28 cgs
Temperature	14,000 K
Rotational velocity (v sin i)	180 km/s
Age	3+2 −1 Myr

C
Mass	6.96±0.32 M_{☉}
Radius	3.6±0.4 R_{☉}
Luminosity	2,800 L_{☉}
Surface gravity (log g)	4.25±0.10 cgs
Temperature	22,300±500 K
Rotation	1.09468(7) days
Rotational velocity (v sin i)	104±10 km/s
Age	3+2 −1 Myr

Other designations
- BD−05°1325, HD 37061, HIP 26258, TYC 4774-906-1

Database references
SIMBAD	data

NU Orionis (HD 37061) is a quadruple star system in the constellation Orion. It is located in the emission nebula Messier 43 and is the main star ionizing it. The distance to the system is 1,360 light-years (420 parsecs), as determined by its stellar parallax.

== Location ==
NU Orionis is within Messier 43 (M43), an emission nebula and H II region that is inside the Orion Nebula. It is the main star ionizing M43, with its radiation sculpting the nebula.

Due to its faint apparent magnitude of 6.8, NU Orionis cannot be seen with the unaided eye, requiring at least binoculars to be seen. Messier 43 itself is magnitude 9, and can be seen with a small telescope. It culminates and is best seen in January.

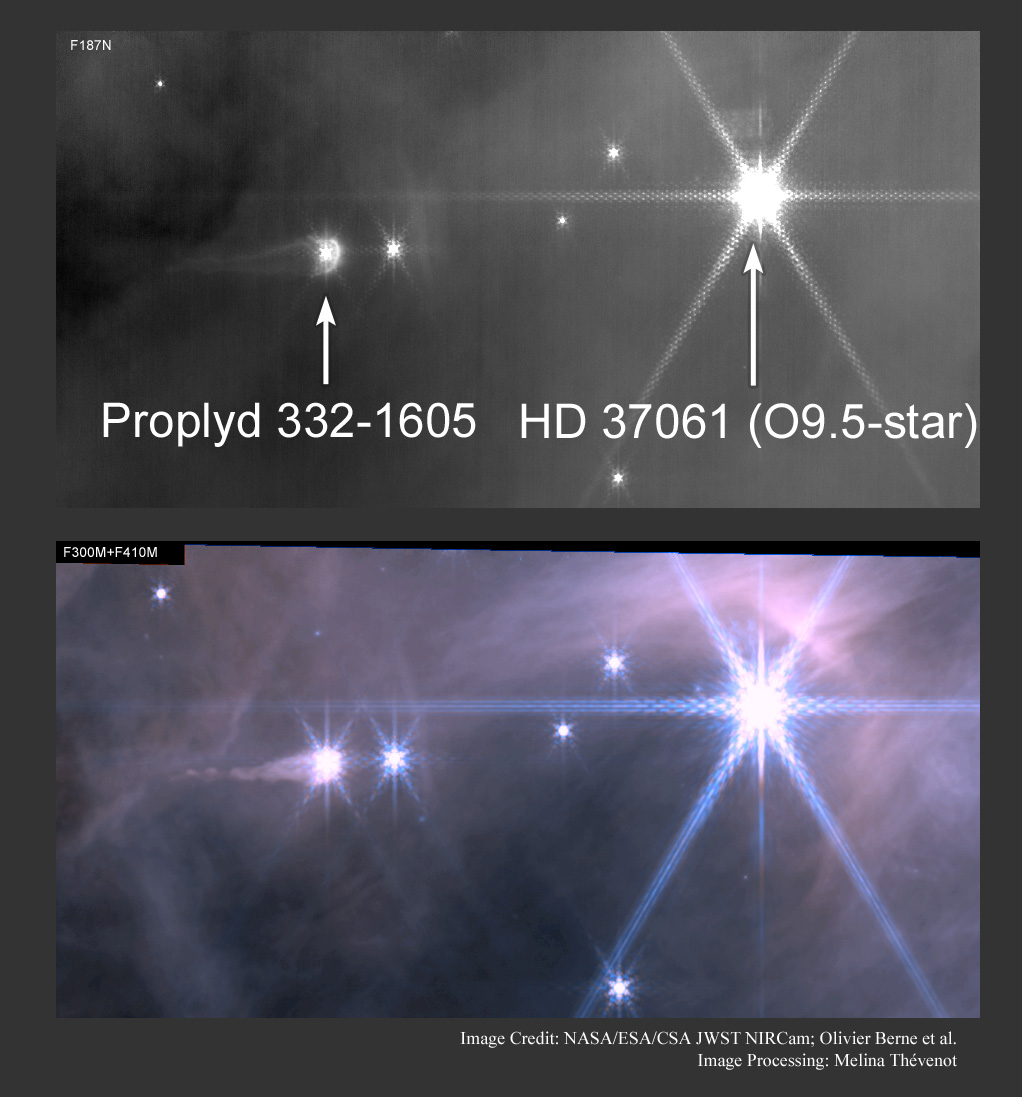
Image of NU Orionis (HD 37061 right side) and a proplyd (left side) from the James Webb Space Telescope.

NU Orionis was identified to be responsible for photoevaporation of several protoplanetary disks around stars in M43. These objects are also called proplyds. Two proplyds were discovered with the Hubble Space Telescope and later one additional proplyd was discovered with the James Webb Space Telescope.

== Variability ==
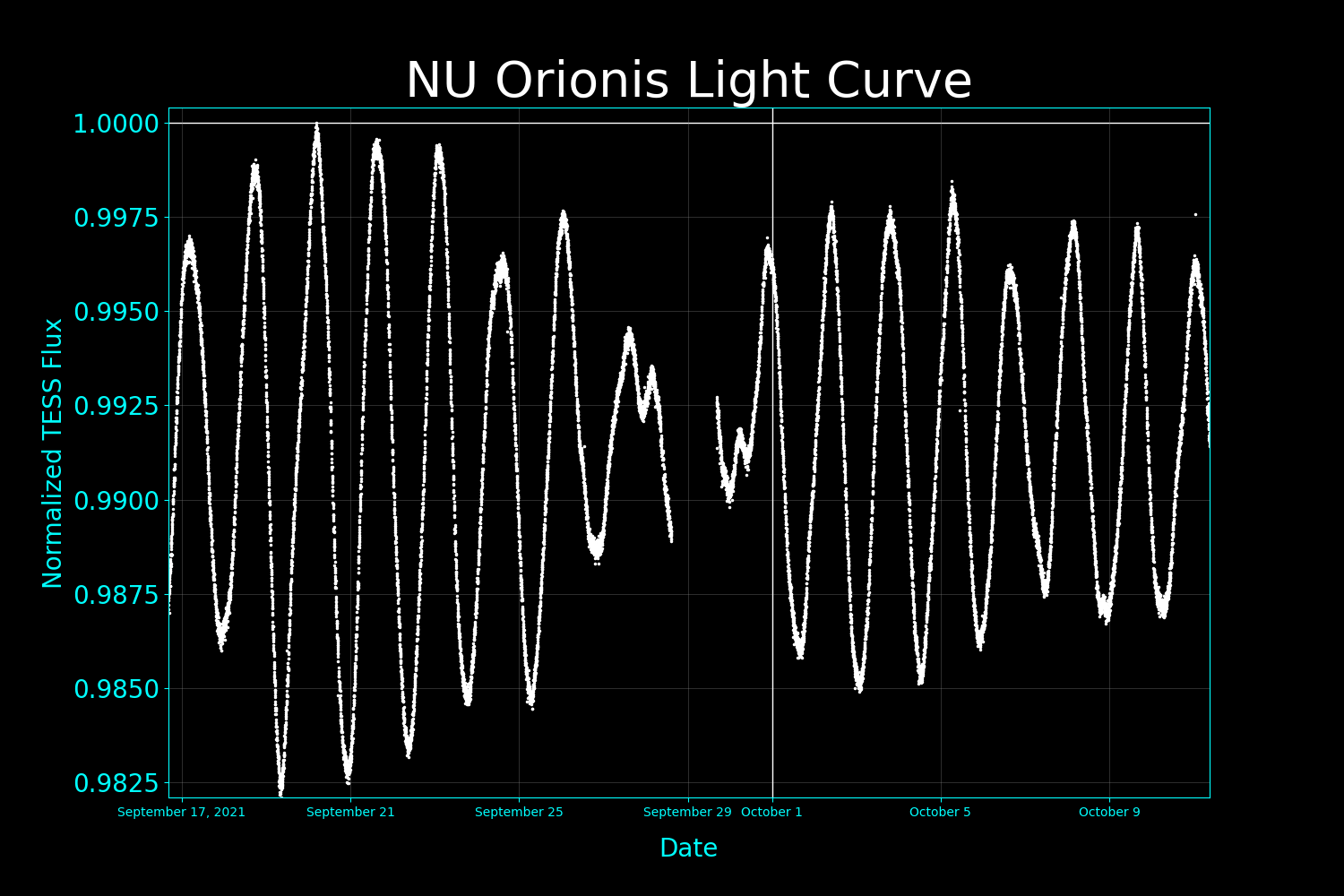
NU Orionis light curve plotted from TESS data

NU Orionis is classified as "INSA" in the General Catalogue of Variable Stars. This acronym means that it is an Orion variable – a hot star with irregular variation – surrounded in nebulosity. The apparent magnitude varies from 6.80 to 6.93. Such classification is typical of hot, very young stars in the early stages of evolution. The estimated age of NU Ori is 3 million years.

== Star system ==
Aa
0.36 au (14.3 d)
Ab
3.77 au (1.3 years)
C
470 mas (439 years)
B

Hierarchy of components in the NU Orionis system

NU Orionis was believed to be a single star until 1991, when spectroscopic observations revealed it to be a close binary with an orbital period of about 19 days. Subsequently, the distant companion HD 37061 B was discovered in 1999, at a distance of 470 milliarcseconds (mas). In 2013, a candidate fourth member named HD 37061 C was announced, discovered using interferometry at a distance of 15 mas from the central pair. It was confirmed in 2018.

The primary component, NU Orionis Aa, is a B-type main-sequence star with 16.4 times the mass of the Sun and 5.7 times the radius of the Sun, radiating 27,000 times the solar luminosity. Its companion, NU Orionis Ab, orbits with a period of 14.3027 days and is separated by 0.36 astronomical units; the orbit is nearly circular. The star has 4.4 times the mass and 2.5 times the radius of the Sun, radiating 350 times the radiation the Sun does.

The tertiary NU Orionis C is a B-type main-sequence star with 8.1 times the mass, 3.6 times the radius, and radiates 2,800 times the Sun's luminosity. The star has a strong magnetic field. It orbits the Aa-Ab pair with an orbital period of 476 days (1.30 years) and is separated by 3.77 au.

The outer companion B is an A or B-main sequence star with 3.8 times the mass, 2.3 times the radius and 190 times the Sun's luminosity. It has a projected separation of 195 au to the inner triple, an orbit too large to currently have its elements measurable.

The components Aa, B and C are rapid rotators, spinning with projected rotational velocities of 190, 180 and 104 km/s respectively. Component C's rotation period has been measured at around 1.09 days.

== See also ==
- Trapezium Cluster
- Young stellar object
- Star formation
