= Kappa2 Ceti =

Star in the constellation Cetus

κ^{2} Ceti
- Location of κ^{2} Ceti (circled)

Observation data Epoch J2000.0 Equinox J2000.0 (ICRS)
- Constellation: Cetus
- Right ascension: 03^{h} 21^{m} 06.803^{s}
- Declination: +03° 40′ 32.24″
- Apparent magnitude (V): 5.66

Characteristics
- Evolutionary stage: red clump
- Spectral type: G8 III
- U−B color index: +0.73
- B−V color index: +0.97

Astrometry
| Radial velocity (R_{v}) | +7.44±0.10 km/s |
| Proper motion (μ) | RA: +55.161 mas/yr Dec.: −24.383 mas/yr |
| Parallax (π) | 8.821±0.0762 mas |
| Distance | 370 ± 3 ly (113.4 ± 1.0 pc) |
| Absolute magnitude (M_{V}) | 0.630 |

Details
| Mass | 2.46±0.09 M_{☉} |
| Radius | 8.23±0.57 R_{☉} |
| Luminosity | 41.7 L_{☉} |
| Surface gravity (log g) | 2.98±0.04 cgs |
| Temperature | 5,007±22 K |
| Metallicity [Fe/H] | +0.11±0.03 dex |
| Rotational velocity (v sin i) | 0.98±0.45 km/s |
| Age | 610±60 Myr |

Other designations
- κ^{2} Cet, 97 Cet, BD+03°461, HD 20791, HIP 15619, HR 1007, SAO 111142

Database references
| SIMBAD | data |

Kappa^{2} Ceti is a solitary, yellow-hued star located in the equatorial constellation of Cetus. Its name is a Bayer designation that is Latinized from κ^{2} Ceti, and abbreviated Kapp^{2} Cet. or κ^{2} Cet. (Bayer applied the designation g Tauri to the same star as κ Ceti, but this is no longer used.) This star is faintly visible to the naked eye with an apparent visual magnitude of 5.66. Based upon an annual parallax shift of 8.8 mas as seen from Earth, it is located at a distance of approximately 370 light-years (113 pc) from the Sun. It is drifting further away with a line of sight velocity component of +7.4 km/s.

This is an evolved G-type giant star with a stellar classification of G8 III. It is a red clump star on the horizontal branch, which indicates it is generating energy through helium fusion at its core. The star has 2.46 times the mass of the Sun and has expanded to 8.2 times the Sun's radius. It is radiating 42 times the solar luminosity from its photosphere at an effective temperature of 5,007 K.
