= Nu2 Boötis =

Binary star in the constellation Boötes

Nu^{2} Boötis
- Location of ν^{2} Boötis (circled in red)

Observation data Epoch J2000.0 Equinox J2000.0 (ICRS)
- Constellation: Boötes
- Right ascension: 15^{h} 31^{m} 46.983^{s}
- Declination: +40° 53′ 57.61″
- Apparent magnitude (V): 5.02 (5.80 + 5.80)

Characteristics
- Spectral type: A5 V
- U−B color index: +0.11
- B−V color index: +0.07
- R−I color index: 0.04

Astrometry
Radial velocity (R_{v})	−16.6±3.7 km/s
Proper motion (μ)	RA: −22.887 mas/yr Dec.: −12.041 mas/yr
Parallax (π)	7.3894±0.1816 mas
Distance	440 ± 10 ly (135 ± 3 pc)
Absolute magnitude (M_{V})	−0.59

Orbit
Period (P)	9.026±0.017 yr
Semi-major axis (a)	0.0615±0.0007″
Eccentricity (e)	0.006±0.015
Inclination (i)	109.7±1.2°
Longitude of the node (Ω)	199.4±0.9°
Periastron epoch (T)	2000.75±0.24
Argument of periastron (ω) (secondary)	293±9°

Details
Mass	2.84±0.11 M_{☉}
Radius	6.21+1.07 −0.81 R_{☉}
Luminosity	135±3 L_{☉}
Temperature	7894+574 −600 K
Rotational velocity (v sin i)	217 km/s

Other designations
- ν^{2} Boo, ψ Her, 53 Boötis, BD+41°2611, GC 20883, HD 138629, HIP 76041, HR 5774, SAO 45590, ADS 9688, CCDM 15318+4054, WDS J15318+4054AB

Database references
SIMBAD	data

Nu^{2} Boötis is a white-hued binary star system in the northern constellation of Boötes. Its name is a Bayer designation that is Latinized from ν^{2} Boötis, and abbreviated Nu^{2} Boo or ν^{2} Boo. This system is faintly visible to the naked eye as a point of light with a combined apparent visual magnitude of 5.02. Based upon an annual parallax shift of 7.86 mas as seen from the Earth, it is located approximately 441 light-years (135 pc) light years from the Sun. The system is moving closer to the Sun with a radial velocity of −16.6 km/s.

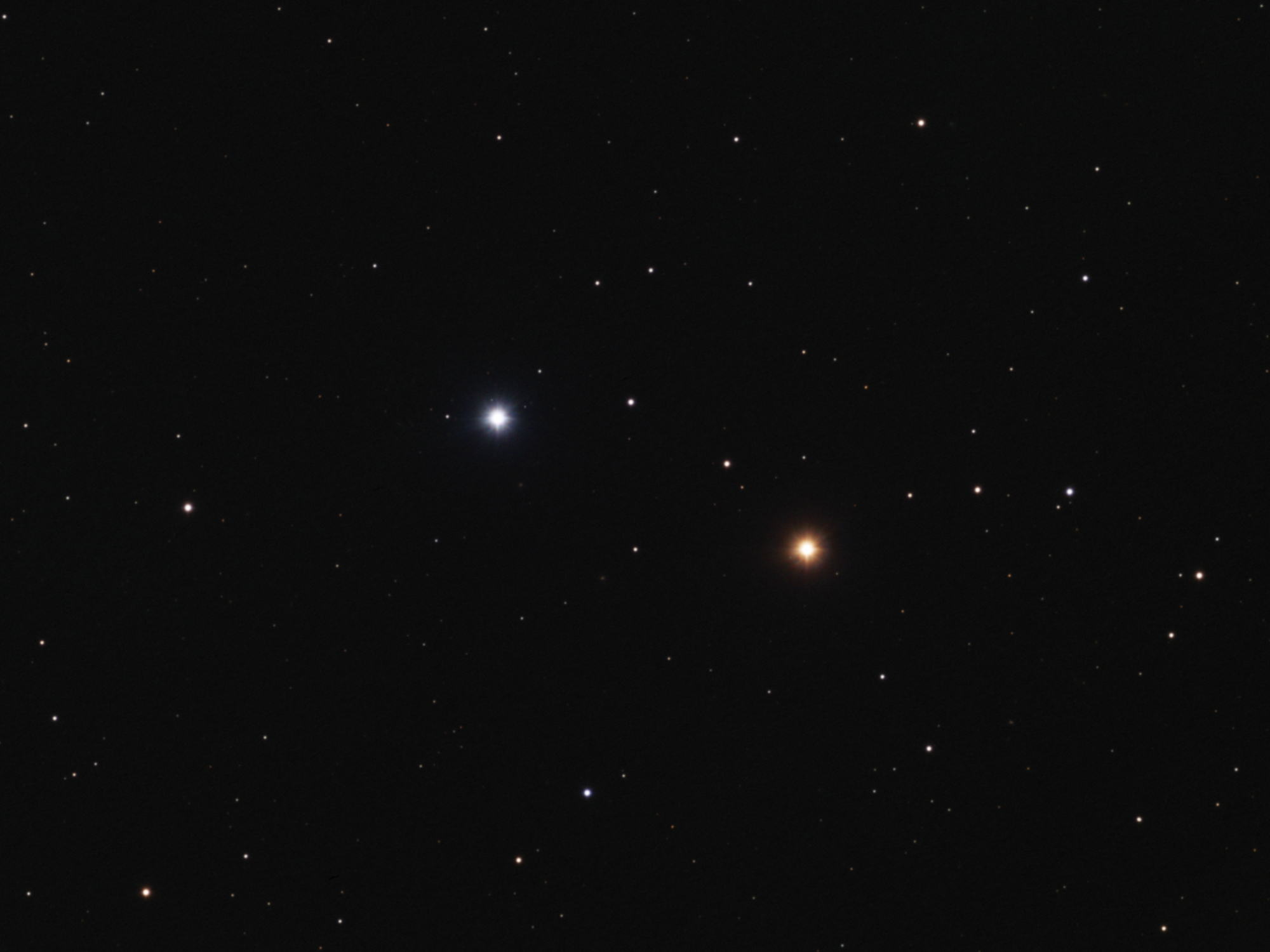
ν^{1} (right) and ν^{2} (left) Boötis in optical light

This stellar pair have a nearly circular orbit with a period of nine years and a semimajor axis of 0.0615 arc seconds. They are both of visual magnitude 5.80 and display a similar spectrum, with the primary, component A, being an A-type main sequence star with a stellar classification of A5 V. This has been identified as an A-type shell star, suggesting there is a circumstellar disk of gas orbiting one or both stars. There are two other stars that appear close to the pair, termed C and D, but they are physically unrelated.

Ptolemy considered Nu Boötis to be shared by Hercules, and Bayer assigned it a designation in both constellations: Nu Boötis (ν Boo) and Psi Herculis (ψ Her). When the modern constellation boundaries were fixed in 1930, the latter designation dropped from use.
