= Nu1 Boötis =

Orange-hued star in the constellation Boötes

Nu^{1} Boötis
- Location of ν^{1} Boötis (circled in red)

Observation data Epoch J2000.0 Equinox J2000.0 (ICRS)
- Constellation: Boötes
- Right ascension: 15^{h} 30^{m} 55.75060^{s}
- Declination: +40° 49′ 58.9743″
- Apparent magnitude (V): +5.02

Characteristics
- Spectral type: K4.5 IIIb Ba0.4
- U−B color index: +1.91
- B−V color index: +1.59

Astrometry
Radial velocity (R_{v})	−11.12±0.16 km/s
Proper motion (μ)	RA: +10.563 mas/yr Dec.: −8.385 mas/yr
Parallax (π)	3.3492±0.077 mas
Distance	970 ± 20 ly (299 ± 7 pc)
Absolute magnitude (M_{V})	−2.22

Details
Radius	99.8±4.26 R_{☉}
Luminosity	2,054±163 L_{☉}
Surface gravity (log g)	1.15±0.17 cgs
Temperature	3,917±27 K
Metallicity [Fe/H]	+0.00±0.06 dex
Rotational velocity (v sin i)	4.2 km/s

Other designations
- ν^{1} Boo, ψ Her, 52 Boötis, BD+41°2609, FK5 573, GC 20866, HD 138481, HIP 75973, HR 5763, SAO 45580, PPM 54790

Database references
SIMBAD	data

Nu^{1} Boötis is an orange-hued star in the northern constellation of Boötes. Its name is a Bayer designation that is Latinized from ν^{1} Boötis, and abbreviated Nu^{1} Boo or ν^{1} Boo. This star has an apparent visual magnitude of +5.02, which is bright enough to be faintly visible to the naked eye. Based upon an annual parallax shift of 3.35 mas as seen from Earth, it is located approximately 970 light years distant from the Sun. At that distance, the visual magnitude of the star is diminished by an extinction of 0.13 due to interstellar dust. It is drifting closer to the Sun with a radial velocity of −11.1 km/s.

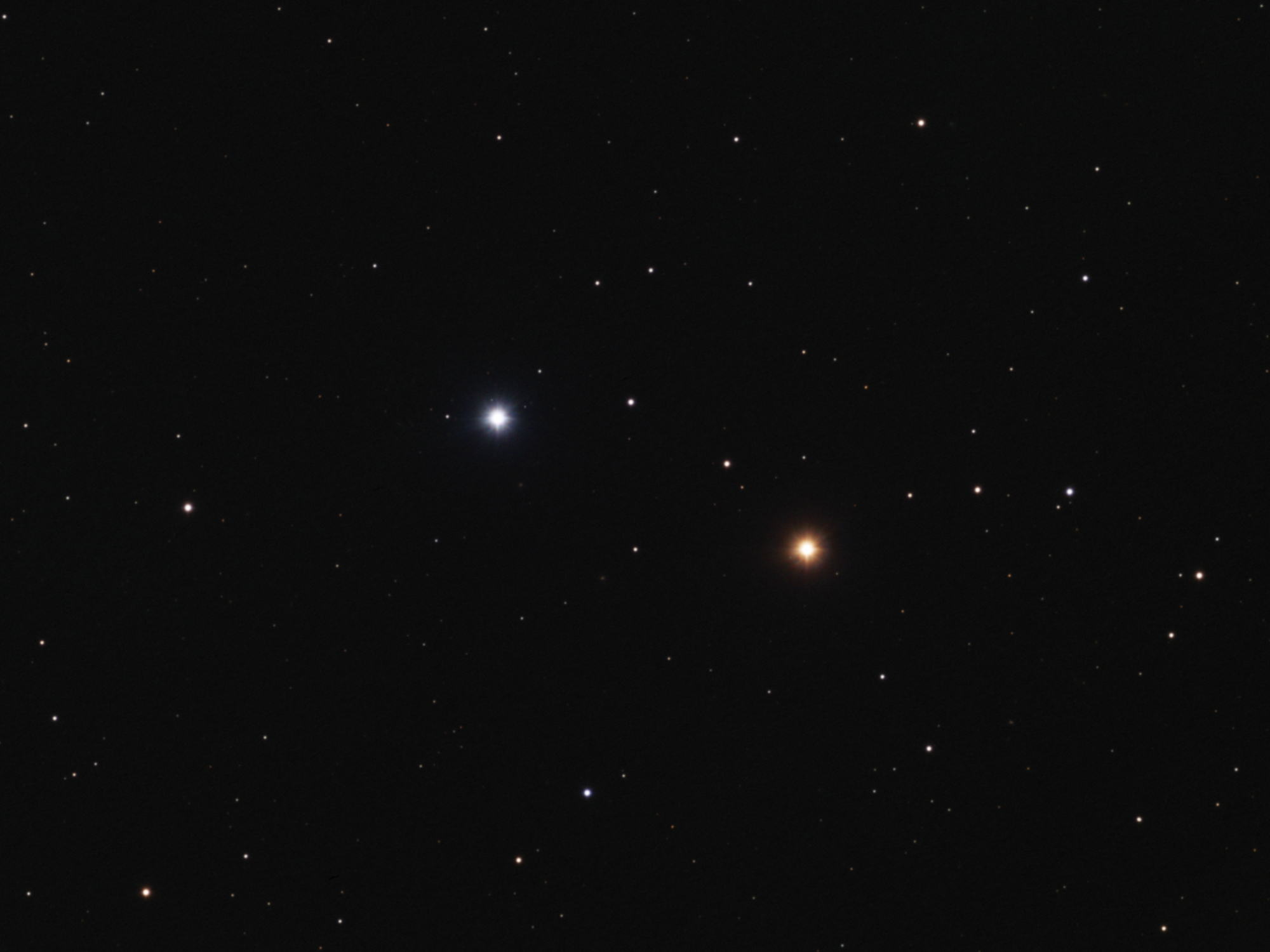
ν^{1} (right) and ν^{2} Boötis in optical light

This is an evolved K-type giant star with a stellar classification of K4.5 IIIb Ba0.4. The 'Ba0.4' suffix notation indicates this is a weak barium star, which means that the stellar atmosphere has been enhanced by s-process elements most likely provided by what is now an orbiting white dwarf companion. The giant component has 99.8 times the radius of the Sun. It is radiating 2,054 times the Sun's luminosity from its enlarged photosphere at an effective temperature of about 3,917 K.

Ptolemy considered Nu Boötis to be shared by Hercules, and Bayer assigned it a designation in both constellations: Nu Boötis (ν Boo) and Psi Herculis (ψ Her). When the modern constellation boundaries were fixed in 1930, the latter designation dropped from use.
