= Omicron1 Orionis =

Binary star system in the constellation Orion

ο^{1} Orionis
- Location of ο^{1} Orionis (circled)

Observation data Epoch J2000.0 Equinox J2000.0 (ICRS)
- Constellation: Orion
- Right ascension: 04^{h} 52^{m} 31.96357^{s}
- Declination: +14° 15′ 02.3215″
- Apparent magnitude (V): 4.65 - 4.88

Characteristics
- Evolutionary stage: AGB
- Spectral type: M3S III
- U−B color index: +2.03
- B−V color index: +1.74
- Variable type: SRb

Astrometry
| Radial velocity (R_{v}) | −8.40±0.23 km/s |
| Proper motion (μ) | RA: −0.05 mas/yr Dec.: −54.81 mas/yr |
| Parallax (π) | 5.01±0.71 mas |
| Distance | approx. 650 ly (approx. 200 pc) |

Details
| Mass | 0.9 M_{☉} |
| Radius | 214±29 R_{☉} |
| Luminosity | 4,046 L_{☉} |
| Surface gravity (log g) | 0.76±0.29 cgs |
| Temperature | 3,465±27 K |
| Metallicity [Fe/H] | −0.03±0.12 dex |

Other designations
- ο^{1} Ori, 4 Orionis, BD+14 777, FK5 1136, HD 30959, HIP 22667, HR 1556, SAO 94176

Database references
| SIMBAD | data |

Omicron^{1} Orionis (ο^{1} Ori) is a binary star in the northeastern corner of the constellation Orion. It is visible to the naked eye with an apparent visual magnitude of 4.7. Based upon an annual parallax shift of 5.01±0.71 mas, it is located approximately 650 light years from the Sun. At that distance, the visual magnitude of the star is diminished by an interstellar absorption factor of 0.27 due to intervening dust.

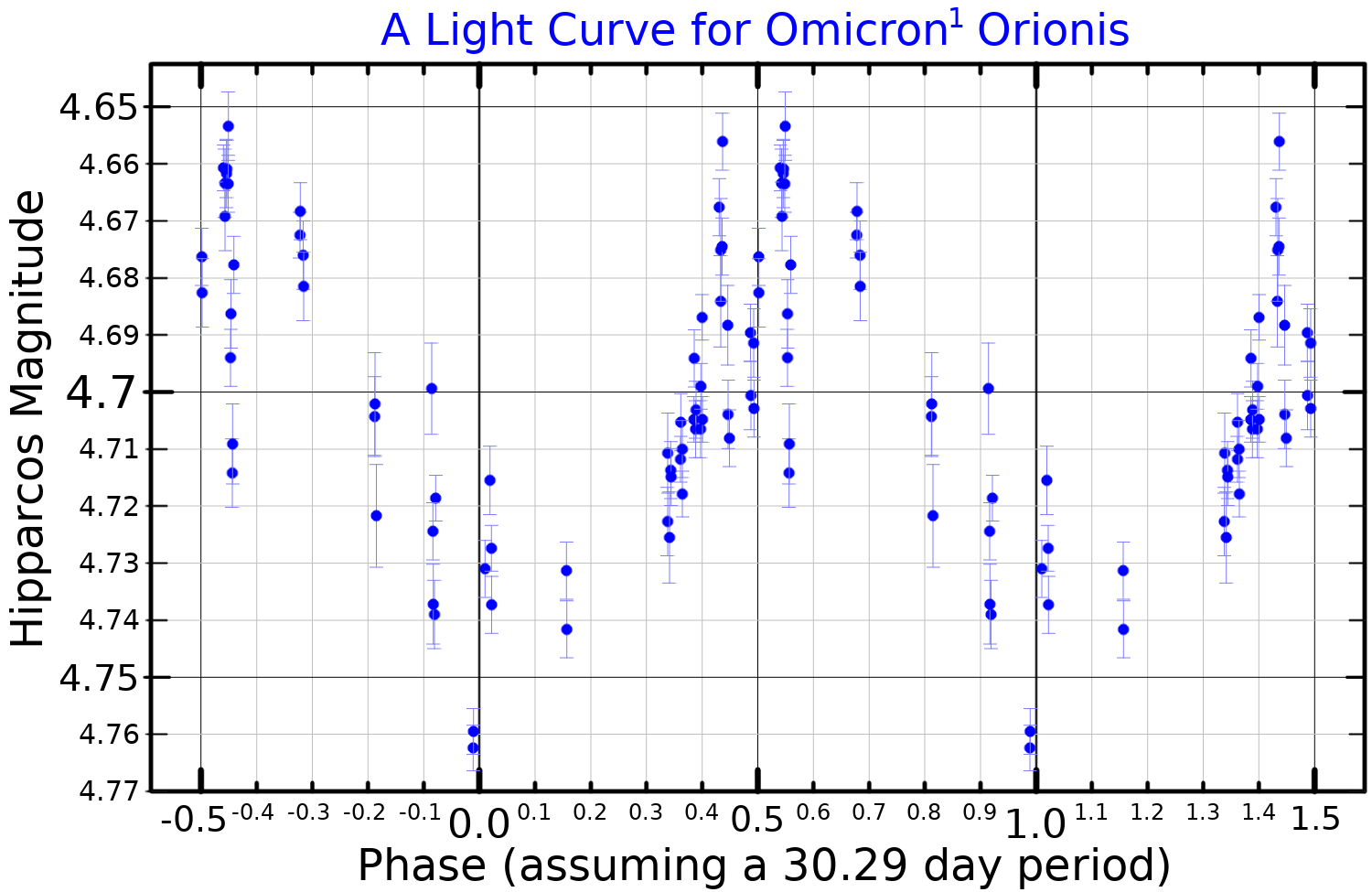
A light curve for Omicron^{1} Orionis, plotted from Hipparcos data

The two components of this system have an orbital period of greater than 1,900 days (5.2 years). The primary component is an evolved red giant with the stellar classification of M3S III. This is an S-type star on the asymptotic giant branch. The variability of the brightness of ο^{1} Orionis was announced by Joel Stebbins and Charles Morse Huffer in 1928, based on observations made at Washburn Observatory.It is a semiregular variable that is pulsating with periods of 30.8 and 70.7 days, each with nearly identical amplitudes of 0.05 in magnitude. The star has an estimated 90% of the mass of the Sun but has expanded to 214 times the Sun's radius. It shines with 4,046 times the solar luminosity from its outer atmosphere at an effective temperature of 3,465 K.
