= Pi1 Orionis =

Star in the constellation Orion

π^{1} Orionis
- Location of π^{1} Orionis (circled)

Observation data Epoch J2000.0 Equinox J2000.0 (ICRS)
- Constellation: Orion
- Right ascension: 04^{h} 54^{m} 53.72877^{s}
- Declination: +10° 09′ 02.9952″
- Apparent magnitude (V): 4.74

Characteristics
- Spectral type: A3 Va
- U−B color index: +0.09
- B−V color index: +0.08

Astrometry
Proper motion (μ)	RA: +41.49 mas/yr Dec.: −128.73 mas/yr
Parallax (π)	28.04±0.25 mas
Distance	116 ± 1 ly (35.7 ± 0.3 pc)
Absolute magnitude (M_{V})	1.71±0.09

Details
Mass	1.90+0.08 −0.09 M_{☉}
Radius	1.73±0.13 R_{☉}
Luminosity	16.91+1.42 −1.29 L_{☉}
Surface gravity (log g)	4.22+0.04 −0.05 cgs
Temperature	8,900±131 K
Metallicity [Fe/H]	−0.12+0.14 −0.16 dex
Rotational velocity (v sin i)	120 km/s
Age	100 Myr

Other designations
- π^{1} Ori, 7 Orionis, BD+09°683, HD 31295, HIP 22845, HR 1570, SAO 94201

Database references
SIMBAD	data

Pi^{1} Orionis (π^{1} Ori, π^{1} Orionis) is a star in the equatorial constellation of Orion. It is faintly visible to the naked eye with an apparent visual magnitude of 4.74. Based upon an annual parallax shift of 28.04 mas, it is located about 116 light-years from the Sun.

This is an A-type main-sequence star with a stellar classification of A3 Va. It is a Lambda Boötis star, which means the spectrum shows lower-than-expected abundances for heavier elements. Pi^{1} Orionis is a relatively young star, just 100 million years old, and is spinning fairly rapidly with a projected rotational velocity of 120 km/s. It has nearly double the mass of the Sun and 173% of the Sun's radius. The star radiates 16.9 times the solar luminosity from its outer atmosphere at an effective temperature of 8,900 K.

An infrared excess indicates there is a debris disk with a temperature of 80 K orbiting 49 AU from the star. The dust has a combined mass 2.2% that of the Earth.
