= Pi6 Orionis =

Star in the constellation Orion

Pi^{6} Orionis
- Location of π^{6} Orionis (circled)

Observation data Epoch J2000.0 Equinox J2000.0 (ICRS)
- Constellation: Orion
- Right ascension: 04^{h} 58^{m} 32.90210^{s}
- Declination: +01° 42′ 50.4582″
- Apparent magnitude (V): 4.469

Characteristics
- Evolutionary stage: horizontal branch
- Spectral type: K0/1 III
- U−B color index: +1.506
- B−V color index: +1.390

Astrometry
Radial velocity (R_{v})	+15.36±0.24 km/s
Proper motion (μ)	RA: −1.30 mas/yr Dec.: −7.67 mas/yr
Parallax (π)	3.45±0.30 mas
Distance	950 ± 80 ly (290 ± 30 pc)
Absolute magnitude (M_{V})	−2.86

Details
Mass	4.15±0.68 M_{☉}
Radius	87.73±9.79 R_{☉}
Luminosity	2,185.6±418.7 L_{☉}
Surface gravity (log g)	1.20±0.15 cgs
Temperature	4,217±121 K
Metallicity [Fe/H]	−0.23±0.10 dex
Rotational velocity (v sin i)	8 km/s
Age	230±11 Myr

Other designations
- π^{6} Ori, 10 Orionis, BD+01°872, HD 31767, HIP 23123, HR 1601, SAO 112281

Database references
SIMBAD	data

Pi^{6} Orionis (π^{6} Ori, π^{6} Orionis) is a solitary star in the eastern part of the constellation Orion. It is visible to the naked eye with an apparent visual magnitude of 4.469. Based upon an annual parallax shift of 3.45 mas, it is around 950 light-years from the Sun. At that distance, the visual magnitude of the star is reduced by an interstellar absorption factor of 0.52.

This is an evolved K-type giant star on the horizontal branch, with a stellar classification of K0/1 III. It is a suspected variable star with a measured variation between 4.45 and 4.49 in visual magnitude. Pi^{6} Orionis has over four times the mass of the Sun and has expanded to around 88 times the Sun's radius. Over the course of its life span, the star has shed around 0.04±0.01 solar mass. With an effective temperature of 4,217 K in its outer atmosphere it is radiating roughly 2,200 times the solar luminosity.
