= Pi5 Orionis =

Spectroscopic binary star system in the constellation Orion

π^{5} Orionis
- Location of π^{5} Orionis (circled)

Observation data Epoch J2000.0 Equinox J2000.0 (ICRS)
- Constellation: Orion
- Right ascension: 04^{h} 54^{m} 15.09604^{s}
- Declination: +02° 26′ 26.4231″
- Apparent magnitude (V): 3.69

Characteristics
- Spectral type: B2 III
- U−B color index: −0.81
- B−V color index: −0.18
- Variable type: Ellipsoidal (SPB?)

Astrometry
Radial velocity (R_{v})	+23.4 km/s
Proper motion (μ)	RA: +0.55 mas/yr Dec.: +0.61 mas/yr
Parallax (π)	2.43±0.39 mas
Distance	approx. 1,300 ly (approx. 410 pc)
Absolute magnitude (M_{V})	−4.3

Orbit
Period (P)	3.700373 d
Semi-major axis (a)	25.9 AU
Eccentricity (e)	0.083±0.040
Inclination (i)	34°
Periastron epoch (T)	2,433,341.088±0.010 JD
Semi-amplitude (K_{1}) (primary)	60.41±1.99 km/s

Details

π^{5} Ori A
Mass	12 M_{☉}
Radius	12 R_{☉}
Luminosity	11,262 L_{☉}
Surface gravity (log g)	3.51 cgs
Temperature	14,496 K
Metallicity [Fe/H]	−0.28 dex
Rotational velocity (v sin i)	90 km/s
Age	15.8±0.2 Myr

π^{5} Ori B
Mass	5.0 M_{☉}
Radius	2.8 - 3.8 R_{☉}
Luminosity	525 - 741 L_{☉}
Surface gravity (log g)	3.98 - 4.24 cgs
Temperature	15,596 - 16,520 K

Other designations
- π^{5} Ori, 8 Orionis, BD+02°810, HD 31237, HIP 22797, HR 1567, SAO 112197

Database references
SIMBAD	data

Pi^{5} Orionis (π^{5} Ori, π^{5} Orionis) is a binary star system in the constellation Orion. It has an apparent visual magnitude of 3.69, which is bright enough to be visible to the naked eye on a clear night. Based upon an annual parallax shift of 2.43 mas, it is around 1,300 light-years distant from the Sun.

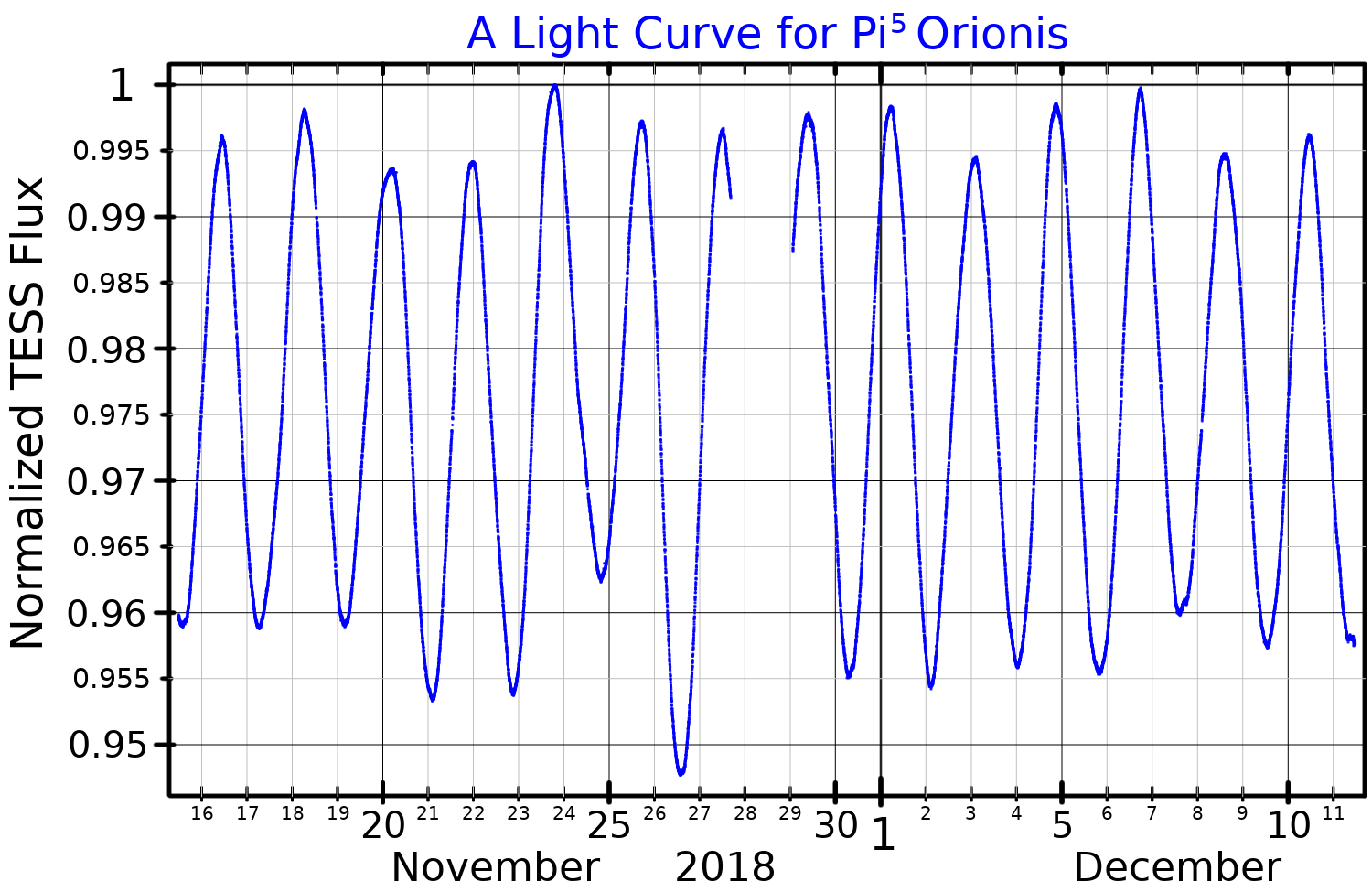
A light curve for Pi^{5} Oronis, plotted from TESS data

This is a single-lined spectroscopic binary star system in a circular orbit with an orbital period of 3.7005 days. It is an ellipsoidal variable, which means the orbit is sufficiently close that the shapes of the components are being distorted by their mutual gravitation. This is causing the visual magnitude of the system to vary regularly by 0^{m}.05 over the course of each orbit, as the orientation of the stars change with respect to the Earth. Detailed analysis of the light curve suggests that the primary star is also pulsating and is probably a Slowly pulsating B-type star.

The primary component is a B-type giant star with a stellar classification of B2 III. It is only about 16 million years old and spins with a projected rotational velocity of 90 km/s. Despite the spectral class, the primary star is thought to be at or near the end of its main sequence evolution. It has about 12.5 times the mass of the Sun and radiates 11,262 times the solar luminosity from its outer atmosphere at an effective temperature of 14,496 K.

The secondary star is not detectable clearly, but modelling of the brightness variations and orbit suggest that it is a main sequence star with a spectral class of about B6. It is smaller, cooler, and much less luminous than the primary, and orbits at about 26 astronomical units.
