= Pi2 Orionis =

Star in the constellation Orion

π^{2} Orionis
- Location of π^{2} Orionis (circled)

Observation data Epoch J2000.0 Equinox J2000.0 (ICRS)
- Constellation: Orion
- Right ascension: 04^{h} 50^{m} 36.72298^{s}
- Declination: +08° 54′ 00.6493″
- Apparent magnitude (V): 4.35

Characteristics
- Spectral type: A1 Vn
- U−B color index: +0.03
- B−V color index: +0.01

Astrometry
Radial velocity (R_{v})	24 km/s
Proper motion (μ)	RA: +1.41 mas/yr Dec.: −29.91 mas/yr
Parallax (π)	14.53±0.38 mas
Distance	224 ± 6 ly (69 ± 2 pc)
Absolute magnitude (M_{V})	0.48

Details
Radius	2.7 R_{☉}
Luminosity	70 L_{☉}
Surface gravity (log g)	4.00±0.05 cgs
Temperature	9,457±128 K
Metallicity [Fe/H]	−0.20±0.10 dex
Rotational velocity (v sin i)	261.4±13.5 km/s

Other designations
- π^{2} Ori, 2 Orionis, BD+08°777, HD 30739, HIP 22509, HR 1544, SAO 112124

Database references
SIMBAD	data

Pi^{2} Orionis (π^{2} Ori, π^{2} Orionis) is the Bayer designation for a solitary star in the equatorial constellation of Orion. Although the Bright Star Catalogue lists this as a spectroscopic binary star system, this does not appear to be the case. It is visible to the naked eye with an apparent visual magnitude of 4.35. Based upon an annual parallax shift of 14.53 mas, it is located roughly 224 light-years away from the Sun.

This is an A-type main-sequence star with a stellar classification of A1 Vn, where the 'n' indicates broad absorption lines due to rotation. It is spinning rapidly with a projected rotational velocity of 261.4 km/s. This is giving the star an oblate shape with an equatorial bulge that is 13% larger than the polar radius. It is shining with 70 times the solar luminosity from its outer atmosphere at an effective temperature of 9,457 K.
