= Pi4 Orionis =

Binary star system in the constellation Orion

π^{4} Orionis
- Location of π^{4} Orionis (circled)

Observation data Epoch J2000.0 Equinox J2000.0 (ICRS)
- Constellation: Orion
- Right ascension: 04^{h} 51^{m} 12.36472^{s}
- Declination: +05° 36′ 18.3723″
- Apparent magnitude (V): 3.685

Characteristics
- Spectral type: B2 III
- U−B color index: −0.797
- B−V color index: −0.180

Astrometry
Radial velocity (R_{v})	23.3 km/s
Proper motion (μ)	RA: −2.21 mas/yr Dec.: +0.85 mas/yr
Parallax (π)	3.10±0.18 mas
Distance	1,050 ± 60 ly (320 ± 20 pc)

Orbit
Period (P)	9.5191 d
Eccentricity (e)	0.03
Periastron epoch (T)	2,418,275.65±10.0
Argument of periastron (ω) (secondary)	165°
Semi-amplitude (K_{1}) (primary)	25.8 km/s

Details

π^{4} Ori A
Mass	10.95±0.97 M_{☉}
Radius	9.1 R_{☉}
Luminosity	19,726 L_{☉}
Surface gravity (log g)	3.59 cgs
Temperature	21,874±126 K
Metallicity [Fe/H]	−0.31 dex
Rotational velocity (v sin i)	38 km/s
Age	15.4±1.0 Myr

Other designations
- π^{4} Ori, 3 Orionis, BD+05°745, FK5 179, HD 30836, HIP 22549, HR 1552, SAO 112142

Database references
SIMBAD	data

Pi^{4} Orionis (π^{4} Ori, π^{4} Orionis) is a binary star system in the western part of the constellation Orion. It is visible to the naked eye with an apparent visual magnitude of 3.7. Based upon an annual parallax shift of 3.1 mass, it is located roughly 1,050 light-years from the Sun.

This is a spectroscopic binary star system with an orbital period of 9.5 days and an eccentricity of 0.03. The primary component is a B-type star with a stellar classification of B2 III. The stellar spectrum of π^{4} Ori A shows a strong depletion of the element boron. It has nearly 11 times the mass of the Sun and nine times the Sun's radius. The star is 15.4 million years old and has a projected rotational velocity of 38 km/s. It shines with 19,726 times the solar luminosity from its outer atmosphere at an effective temperature of 21,874 K.
