= Bayer designation =

Star naming system

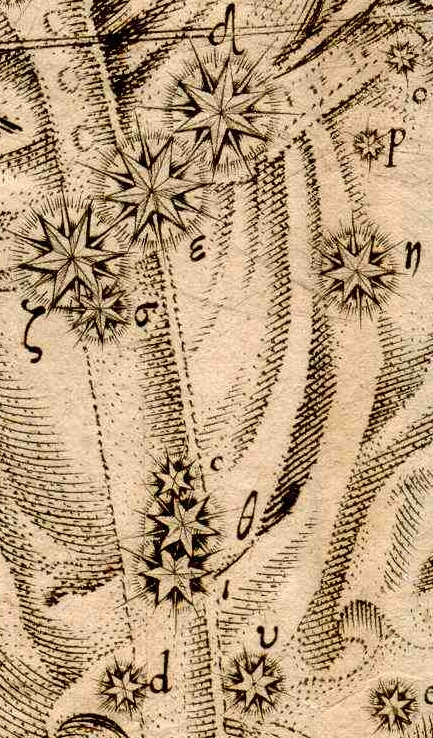
Detail of Bayer's chart for Orion showing the belt stars and Orion Nebula region, with both Greek and Latin letter labels visible

A Bayer designation is a stellar designation in which a specific star is identified by a Greek or Latin letter followed by the genitive form of its parent constellation's Latin name. The original list of Bayer designations contained 1564 stars. The brighter stars were assigned their first systematic names by the German astronomer Johann Bayer in 1603, in his star atlas Uranometria. Bayer catalogued only a few stars too far south to be seen from Germany, but later astronomers (including Nicolas-Louis de Lacaille and Benjamin Apthorp Gould) supplemented Bayer's catalog with entries for southern constellations.

== Scheme ==
Bayer assigned a lowercase Greek letter (alpha (α), beta (β), gamma (γ), etc.) or a Latin letter (A, b, c, etc.) to each star he catalogued, combined with the Latin name of the star's parent constellation in genitive (possessive) form. The constellation name is frequently abbreviated to a standard three-letter form. (Note: See the article 88 modern constellations for a list of the genitive forms and the constellations' standard abbreviations.) For example, Aldebaran in the constellation Taurus (the Bull) is designated α Tauri (abbreviated α Tau, pronounced Alpha Tauri), which means "Alpha of the Bull". (Note: The letters of the Greek alphabet were used in antiquity as numerals, however in a different way.)

Bayer used Greek letters for the brighter stars, but the Greek alphabet has only twenty-four letters, while a single constellation may contain fifty or more stars visible to the naked eye. When the Greek letters ran out, Bayer continued with Latin letters: uppercase A, followed by lowercase b through z (omitting j and v, but o was included), for a total of another 24 letters.

Bayer did not label "permanent" stars with uppercase letters (except for A, which he used instead of a to avoid confusion with α). However, a number of stars in southern constellations have uppercase letter designations, like B Centauri and G Scorpii. These letters were assigned by later astronomers, notably Lacaille in his Coelum Australe Stelliferum and Gould in his Uranometria Argentina. Lacaille followed Bayer's use of Greek letters, but this was insufficient for many constellations. He used first the lowercase letters, starting with a, and if needed the uppercase letters, starting with A, thus deviating somewhat from Bayer's practice. Lacaille used the Latin alphabet three times over in the large constellation Argo Navis, once for each of the three areas that are now the constellations of Carina, Puppis and Vela. That was still insufficient for the number of stars, so he also used uppercase Latin letters such as N Velorum and Q Puppis. Lacaille assigned uppercase letters between R and Z in several constellations, but these have either been dropped to allow the assignment of those letters to variable stars or have actually turned out to be variable.

== Order by magnitude class ==
In most constellations, Bayer assigned Greek and Latin letters to stars within a constellation in rough order of apparent brightness, from brightest to dimmest. The order is not necessarily a precise labeling from brightest to dimmest: in Bayer's day stellar brightness could not be measured precisely. Instead, stars were traditionally assigned to one of six magnitude classes (the brightest to first magnitude, the dimmest to sixth), and Bayer typically ordered stars within a constellation by class: all the first-magnitude stars (in some order), followed by all the second-magnitude stars, and so on. Within each magnitude class, Bayer made no attempt to arrange stars by relative brightness. As a result, the brightest star in each class did not always get listed first in Bayer's order—and the brightest star overall did not necessarily get the designation "Alpha". A good example is the constellation Gemini, where Pollux is Beta Geminorum and the slightly dimmer Castor is Alpha Geminorum.

In addition, Bayer did not always follow the magnitude class rule; he sometimes assigned letters to stars according to their location within a constellation, or the order of their rising, or to historical or mythological details. Occasionally the order looks quite arbitrary.

Of the 88 modern constellations, there are at least 30 in which Alpha is not the brightest star, and four of those lack a star labeled "Alpha" altogether. The constellations with no Alpha-designated star include Vela and Puppis—both formerly part of Argo Navis, whose Greek-letter stars were split among three constellations. Canopus, the former α Argus, is now α Carinae in the modern constellation Carina. Norma's Alpha and Beta were reassigned to Scorpius and re-designated N and H Scorpii respectively, leaving Norma with no Alpha. Francis Baily died before designating an Alpha in Leo Minor, so it also has no Alpha. (The star 46 Leonis Minoris would have been the obvious candidate.)

== Orion as an example ==
In Orion, Bayer first designated Betelgeuse and Rigel, the two 1st-magnitude stars (those of magnitude approximately 1.5 or less), as Alpha and Beta from north to south, with Betelgeuse (the shoulder) coming ahead of Rigel (the foot), even though the latter is usually the brighter. (Betelgeuse is a variable star and can at its maximum occasionally outshine Rigel.) Bayer then repeated the procedure for the stars of the 2nd magnitude, labeling them from gamma through zeta in "top-down" (north-to-south) order. Letters as far as Latin p were used for stars of the sixth magnitude.

Orion constellation map

Bayer's brightest three classes of stars in Orion
Bayer Designation	Bayer's class	Apparent Magnitude	Proper Name
α Orionis	First	0.45	Betelgeuse
β Orionis	First	0.18	Rigel
γ Orionis	Second	1.64	Bellatrix
δ Orionis	Second	2.23	Mintaka
ε Orionis	Second	1.69	Alnilam
ζ Orionis	Second	1.70	Alnitak
η Orionis	Third	3.42	Algjebbah
θ Orionis	Third		(Orion nebula)
ι Orionis	Third	2.77	Hatysa
κ Orionis	Third	2.07	Saiph

== Bayer's miscellaneous labels ==
Although Bayer did not use uppercase Latin letters (except A) for "fixed stars", he did use them to label other items shown on his charts, such as neighboring constellations, "temporary stars", miscellaneous astronomical objects, or reference lines like the Tropic of Cancer. In Cygnus, for example, Bayer's fixed stars run through g, and on this chart Bayer employs H through P as miscellaneous labels, mostly for neighboring constellations. Bayer did not intend such labels as catalog designations, but some have survived to refer to astronomical objects: P Cygni for example is still used as a designation for Nova Cyg 1600. Tycho's Star (SN 1572), another "temporary star", appears as B Cassiopeiae. In charts for constellations that did not exhaust the Greek letters, Bayer sometimes used the leftover Greek letters for miscellaneous labels as well.

== Revised designations ==
Ptolemy designated four stars as "border stars", each shared by two constellations: Alpheratz (in Andromeda and Pegasus), Elnath (in Taurus and Auriga), Nu Boötis (Nu^{1} and Nu^{2}) (in Boötes and Hercules) and Fomalhaut (in Piscis Austrinus and Aquarius). Bayer assigned the first three of these stars a Greek letter from both constellations: Alpha Andromedae = Delta Pegasi, Beta Tauri = Gamma Aurigae, and Nu Boötis = Psi Herculis. (He catalogued Fomalhaut only once, as Alpha Piscis Austrini.) When the International Astronomical Union (IAU) assigned definite boundaries to the constellations in 1930, it declared that stars and other celestial objects can belong to only one constellation. Consequently, the redundant second designation in each pair above has dropped out of use.

Bayer assigned two stars duplicate names by mistake: Xi Arietis (duplicated as Psi Ceti) and Kappa Ceti (Kappa^{1} and Kappa^{2}) (duplicated as g Tauri). He corrected these in the Coelum Stellatum Christianum of 1627 on which he collaborated with Julius Schiller, and the duplicate designations were no longer used.

Other cases of multiple Bayer designations arose when stars named by Bayer in one constellation were transferred by later astronomers to a different constellation. Bayer's Gamma and Omicron Scorpii, for example, were later reassigned from Scorpius to Libra and given the new names Sigma and Upsilon Librae. (To add to the confusion, the star now known as Omicron Scorpii was not named by Bayer but was assigned the designation o Scorpii (Latin lowercase 'o') by Lacaille—which later astronomers misinterpreted as omicron once Bayer's omicron had been reassigned to Libra.)

A few stars no longer lie (according to the modern constellation boundaries) within the constellation for which they are named. The proper motion of Rho Aquilae, for example, carried it across the boundary into Delphinus in 1992.

A further complication is the use of numeric superscripts to distinguish neighboring stars that Bayer (or a later astronomer) labeled with a common letter. Usually these are double stars (mostly optical doubles rather than true binary stars), but there are some exceptions such as the chain of stars π^{1}, π^{2}, π^{3}, π^{4}, π^{5} and π^{6} Orionis. The most stars given the same Bayer designation but with an extra number attached to it is Psi Aurigae. (ψ^{1}, ψ^{2}, ψ^{3}, ψ^{4}, ψ^{5}, ψ^{6}, ψ^{7}, ψ^{8}, ψ^{9}, ψ^{10}, although according to the modern IAU constellation boundaries, ψ^{10} lies in Lynx).

== See also ==
- Flamsteed designation
- Gould designation
- Lists of constellations
- Star catalogue
- Stellar designations and names
- Table of stars with Bayer designations
- Variable star designation
