= Sreekumar =

Sreekumar is an Indian name. Notable people with this name include:

Surname:

- Anila Sreekumar, Indian actress working in Malayalam films and television
- E. P. Sreekumar, Indian short story writer and novelist in Malayalam
- Jagathy Sreekumar (born 1951), Indian actor, director and playback singer
- Kavalam Sreekumar, classical musician, Malayalam film singer and music composer from Kerala, India
- Kureepuzha Sreekumar (born 1955), Malayalam poet with modernist inclinations
- Laxman Sreekumar (born 1987), Indian-born cricketer
- M. G. Sreekumar (born 1957), Indian playback singer, composer, music producer, TV presenter, film producer
- P. Sreekumar, Indian actor, scriptwriter, director and producer who appears in Malayalam movies
- Punnala Sreekumar, the general secretary of Kerala Pulayar Maha Sabha
- R. B. Sreekumar, former Gujarat State Director-General of Police
- S. P. Sreekumar, Indian actor who works in Malayalam cinema and TV series
- Sneha Sreekumar (born 1986), Indian actress and dancer in Malayalam films, TV serials and theatre dramas
- T. T. Sreekumar, Indian writer, social and literary critic, political analyst
- V. Sreekumar (1966–2014), Indian cricketer
- V. A. Shrikumar, Indian ad film, feature film director and businessman

Given name:

- Sreekumar Krishnan Nair, Indian filmmaker
- Sreekumar Nair (born 1978), former Indian first class cricketer
- Sreekumar Prabhakaran, AVSM, VM, retired officer of the Indian Air Force

== See also ==
- Shreekumar
- Srikumar Rao
