= Barnard 30 =

Dark nebula in the constellation Orion

Molecular cloud
- dark nebula
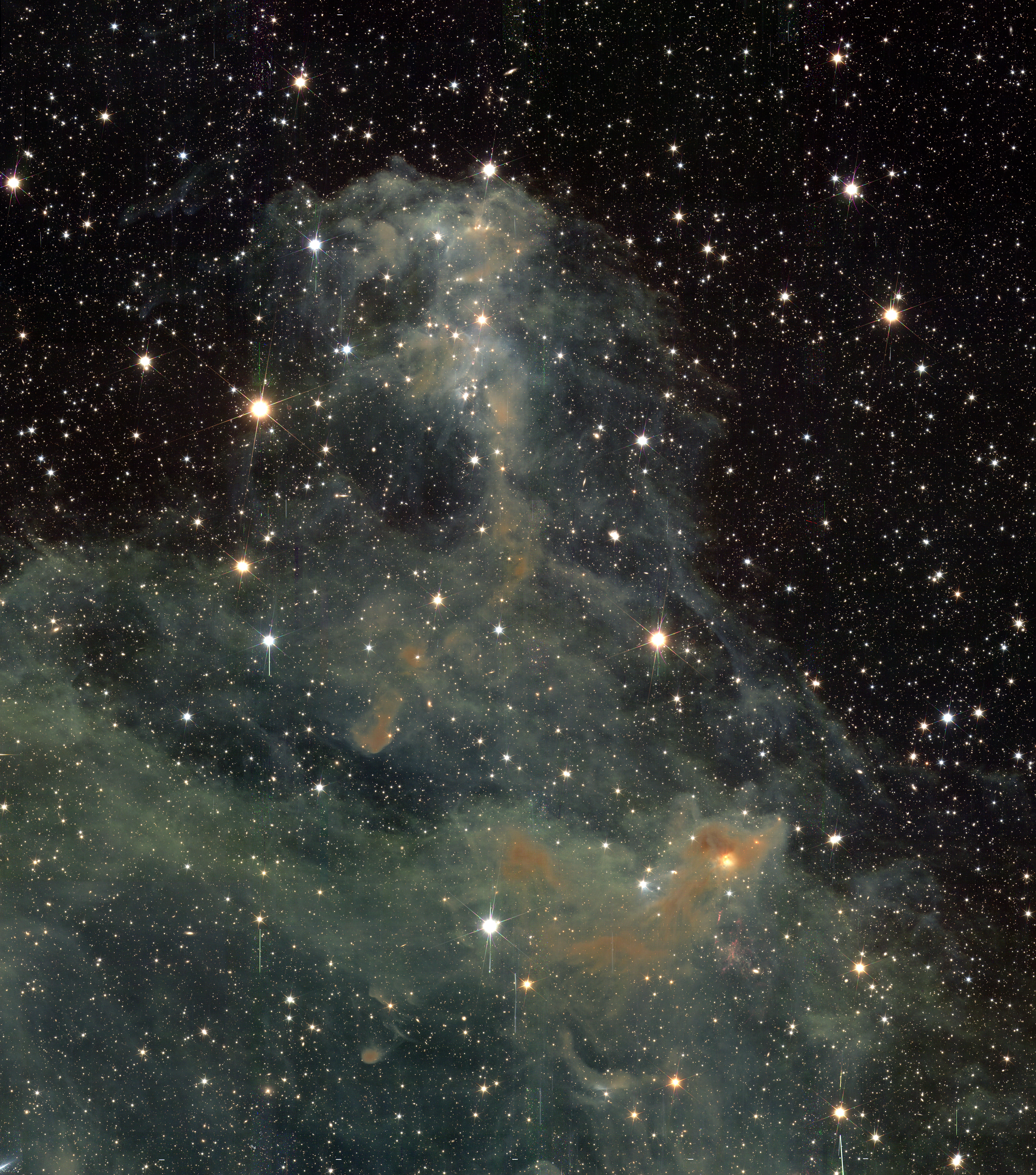
- Barnard 30 with ESA Euclid in near-infrared (north at the bottom)

Observation data: J2000.0 epoch
- Right ascension: 05^{h} 30^{m} 18.0^{s}
- Declination: +12° 46′ 00″
- Distance: 1300 ly (400 pc)
- Constellation: Orion (constellation)
- Designations: Barnard 30

Barnard 30 is a dark cloud in the Lambda Orionis ring, north of Lambda Orionis, also called Meissa. The region is about 1300 light years from Earth.

The Barnard 30 cloud is one of the regions in the Lambda Orionis Ring where the population of young stars is concentrated, together with the Lambda Orionis cluster and Barnard 35. It contains Herbig-Haro Objects, young stars, brown dwarfs and multiple T Tauri stars. The young population includes HK Orionis, a Herbig Ae/Be star and HI Orionis, a T Tauri star.

The stellar population in Barnard 30 is about 2-3 million years old and is therefore significantly younger than the central Lambda Orionis cluster. This cloud is likely shaped by the massive star Meissa and this star is also responsible for triggering star-formation in this cloud. A possible supernova 1 million years ago that possibly has formed the Lambda Orionis ring might be an additional trigger for the star-formation in this region.

The region contains a reflection nebula.

== Observations ==
The emission region associated with Barnard 30 has a low surface brightness and covers a large region of the sky. Because Barnard 30 shares the same constellation as the famous Orion Nebula it is rarely imaged.

== Gallery ==
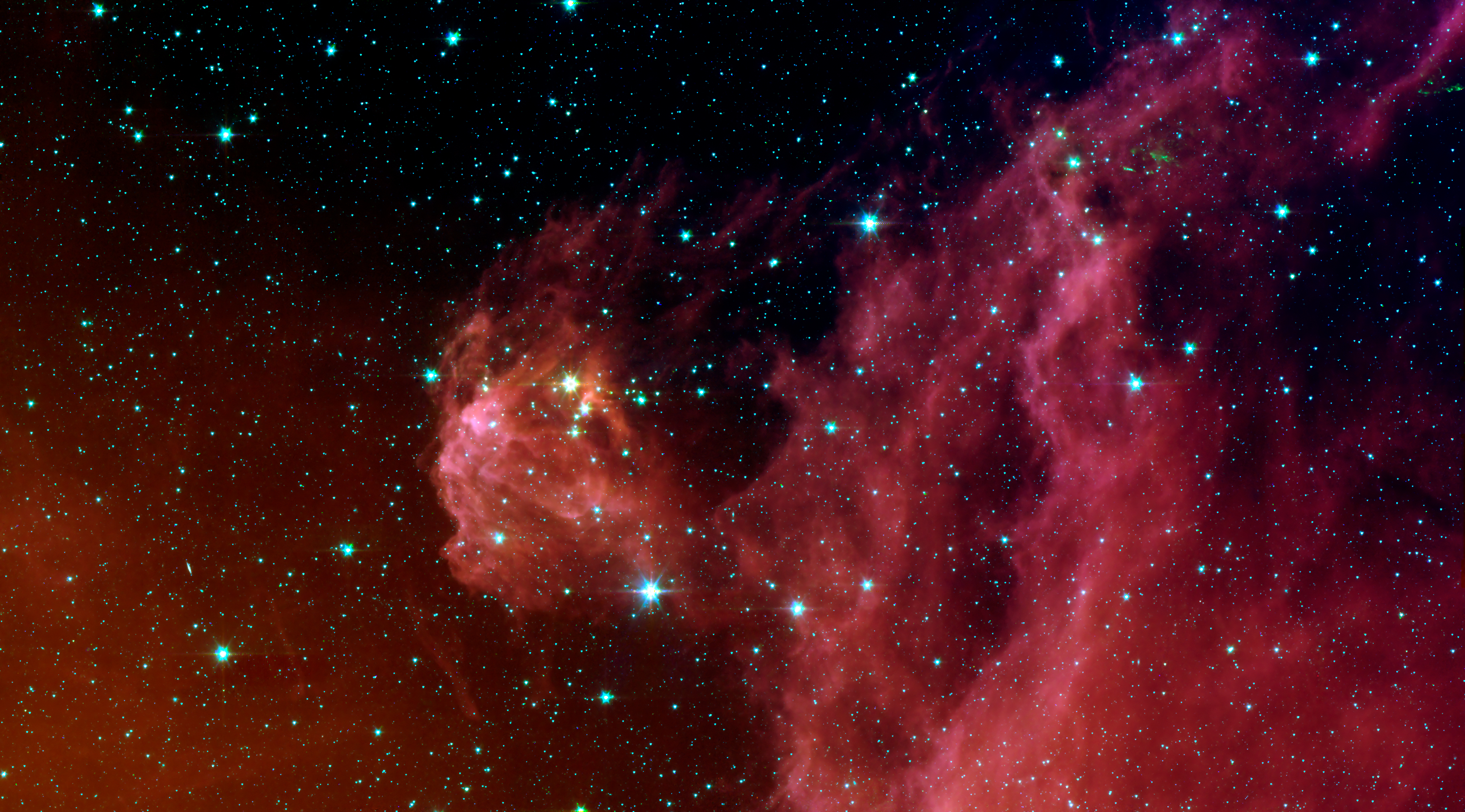
Barnard 30 seen by the Spitzer Space Telescope

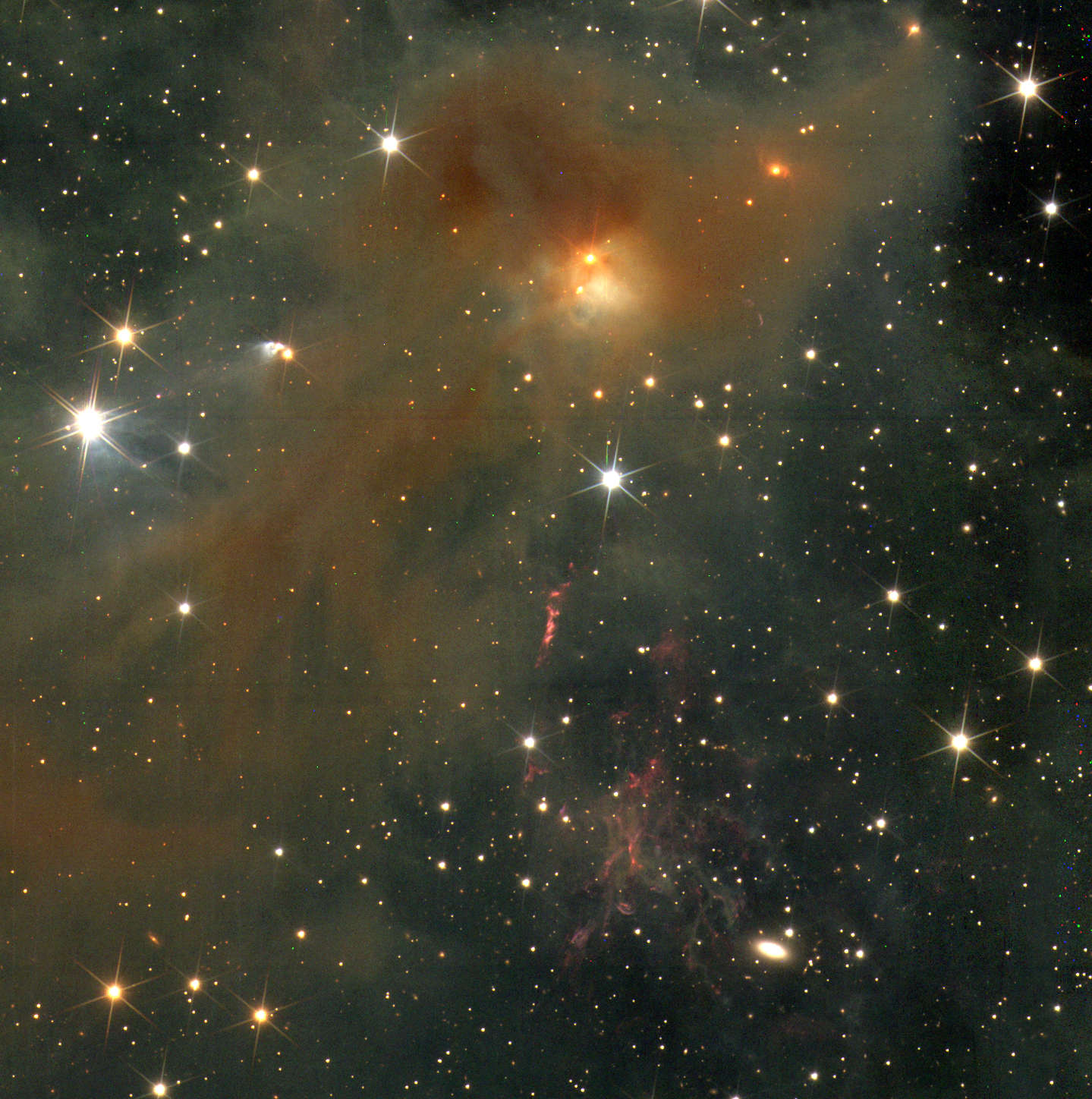
Detail of star-formation in Barnard 30 with Euclid
