= Phi Orionis =

The Bayer designation Phi Orionis (φ Ori, φ Orionis) is shared by two star systems in the constellation Orion.

- Phi^{1} Orionis
- Phi^{2} Orionis

The two stars are separated by approximately 0.71° in the sky.

== Etymology ==
Both of φ Ori and λ Ori were Al Haḳʽah, "a White Spot".

The similar composition were found in Chinese astronomy, known as 觜宿 (Zī Sù), meaning Turtle Beak (asterism), Consequently, both of φ Ori themselves is known as 觜宿二 (Zī Sù èr English: the Second Star of Turtle Beak.) (for φ^{1}Ori) and 觜宿三 (Zī Sù sān English: the Third Star of Turtle Beak.) (for φ^{2}Ori)
