= Orion's head =

Orion's head may refer to:

Structures in the constellation Orion:

- Lambda Orionis, binary star
- Collinder 69, star cluster including Lambda Orionis
