= Pulaya =

Caste group in India

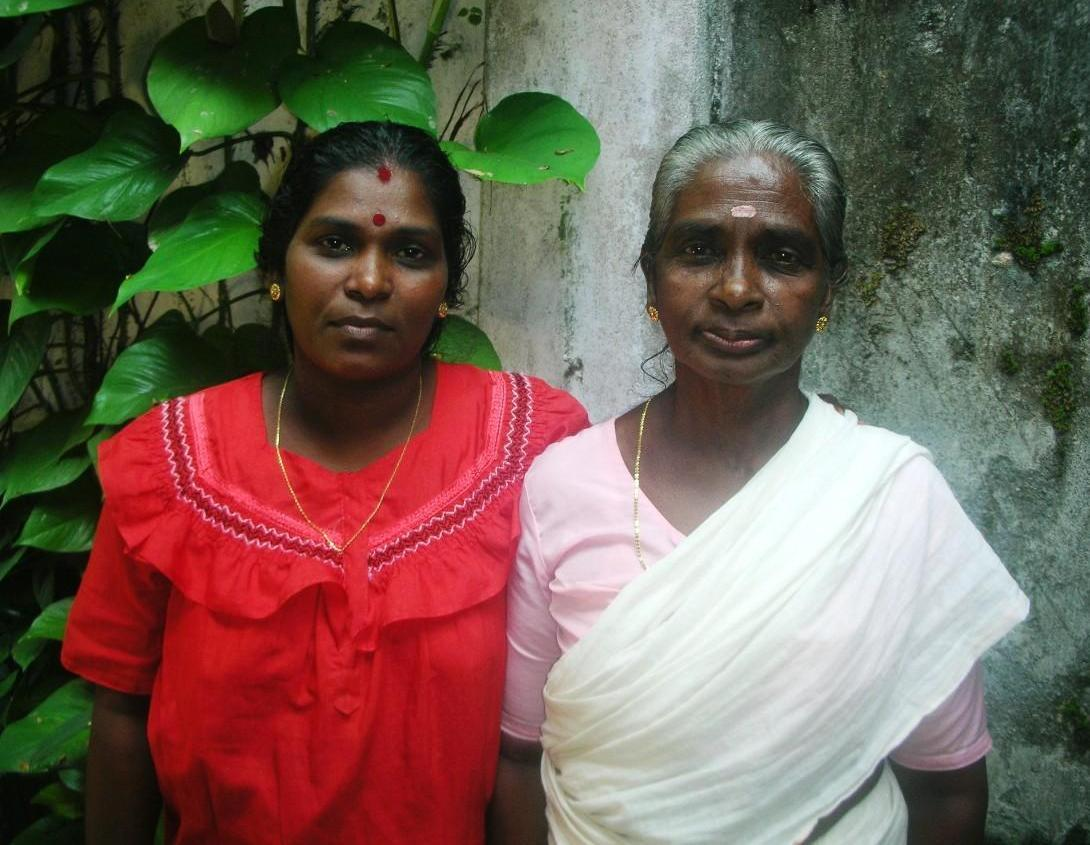
- Two Pulaya women from Kerala
- Religions: Hinduism, Christianity, Buddhism
- Languages: Malayalam, Kannada
- Country: India
- Populated states: Kerala, Karnataka, Tamilnadu
- Ethnicity: Malayali
- Notable members: Ayyankali, P. K. Chathan Master

Pulaya (also called Cheraman, Cheruman, mas. Pulayan; fem. Pulayi, Pulachi; pl. Pulayar/Pulayas, Cherumar/Cheramar/Cherumas, IPA: [pulɐjɐ, tʃerumɐ]) is a caste group mostly found in modern-day Indian states of Kerala, Karnataka and historically in Tamil Nadu. They are classified as a Scheduled Caste under India's reservation system in Kerala and Tamil Nadu.

== Traditions ==
Pulayars are noted for their music, craftsmanship, and for certain dances which include Kōlam-thullal, a mask dance which is part of their exorcism rituals, as well as the Mudi-āttam or hair-dance which has its origins in a fertility ritual. The folk dance Chozhikali is performed by the Pulayar community of central Kerala.

== Demography ==
According to the 2011 Census, the Pulayan population in Kerala was 1,338,008. They are a Scheduled Caste under India's reservation system in the state of Kerala and Tamil Nadu.

== Notable people ==
- Ayyankali (1863–1941), social reformer
- K. G. Balakrishnan, 37th Chief Justice of India
- Dharmajan Bolgatty, Indian actor
- Chittayam Gopakumar, deputy speaker of 14th Kerala legislative assembly
- Nandanar, a Nayanar saint, venerated in the Hindu sect of Shaivism
- C. T. Ravikumar, judge of the Supreme Court of India
- P. K. Rosy (1903–1988), first heroine of the Malayalam film industry
- Punnala Sreekumar, general secretary of Kerala Pulayar Maha Sabha (KPMS)
- Kodikunnel Suresh, member of Parliament
- K. P. Vallon (1894–1940), social reformer
- Dakshayani Velayudhan (1912–1978), former member of the Constituent Assembly
- Vinayakan, actor and dancer

== See also ==
- Caste system in Kerala

Arts of Pulayar caste:

- Chimmanakali
- Mangalamkali
