= HD 34989 =

Star in the constellation Orion

- Location of HD 34989 (circled in red)

Observation data Epoch J2000.0 Equinox ICRS
- Constellation: Orion
- Right ascension: 05^{h} 21^{m} 43.5624^{s}
- Declination: +08° 25′ 42.799″
- Apparent magnitude (V): 5.80

Characteristics
- Spectral type: B1V
- U−B color index: −0.88
- B−V color index: −0.13

Astrometry
Radial velocity (R_{v})	25.30±3.5 km/s
Proper motion (μ)	RA: −0.849±0.154 mas/yr Dec.: −1.791±0.100 mas/yr
Parallax (π)	2.5571±0.1556 mas
Distance	1,280 ± 80 ly (390 ± 20 pc)
Absolute magnitude (M_{V})	−2.36

Details
Mass	12.1±0.1 M_{☉}
Radius	7.4 R_{☉}
Luminosity	3,133 L_{☉}
Surface gravity (log g)	4.194±0.044 cgs
Temperature	24,838±450 K
Metallicity [Fe/H]	−0.43 dex
Rotation	9.3 days
Rotational velocity (v sin i)	30±16 km/s
Age	8.0±2.0 Myr

Other designations
- HIP 25041, HD 34989, PMC 90-93 1242, uvby98 100034989, AG+08°591, PPM 148818, VDB 38, ALS 8286, HR 1763, ROT 774, WH 21, BD+08°933, IRAS 05190+0822, SAO 112667, YZ 8 2140, FK5 2401, JP11 1038, GC 6574, LS VI +08 1, TD1 4461, GCRV 3206, 2MASS J05214355+0825425, TYC 700-1015-1, MCW 299, UBV 5096, GSC 00700-01015, N30 1147, UBV M 10870

Database references
SIMBAD	data

HD 34989 is a blue-white star in the main sequence, of apparent magnitude 5.80, in the constellation of Orion. It is 1700 light-years from the Solar System.

== Observation ==
The star is in the northern celestial hemisphere, but close to the celestial equator; this means that it can be observed from all the inhabited regions of the Earth without difficulty and that it is not visible only in the innermost areas of Antarctica. It appears as circumpolar only far beyond the Arctic polar circle. Its brightness puts it at the limit of visibility to the naked eye, so to be observed without the aid of devices requires a clear, and preferably moonless, sky.

The best period for observation in the evening sky is between late October and April from both hemispheres; in February (as at J2000) it is anti-posed from the Sun. In July and August its direction is close to that of the Sun, therefore coinciding with most hours of daylight.

== Physical characteristics ==
It is a blue-white star of the main sequence, having an absolute magnitude of −2.36 and its positive radial velocity indicates that the star is moving away from the Solar System.

The star appears wrapped in an extensive nebulosity that partly shines by reflection and partly by emission. The reflection nebula is listed as GN 05.19.0 and the HII region is called Sh2-263. HD 34989 is the ionizing source of this HII-region. In observations with carbon monoxide this corresponds to a circular hole.

The star has a size of about 0.118 ± 0.026 milliarcseconds, based on SED fitting.

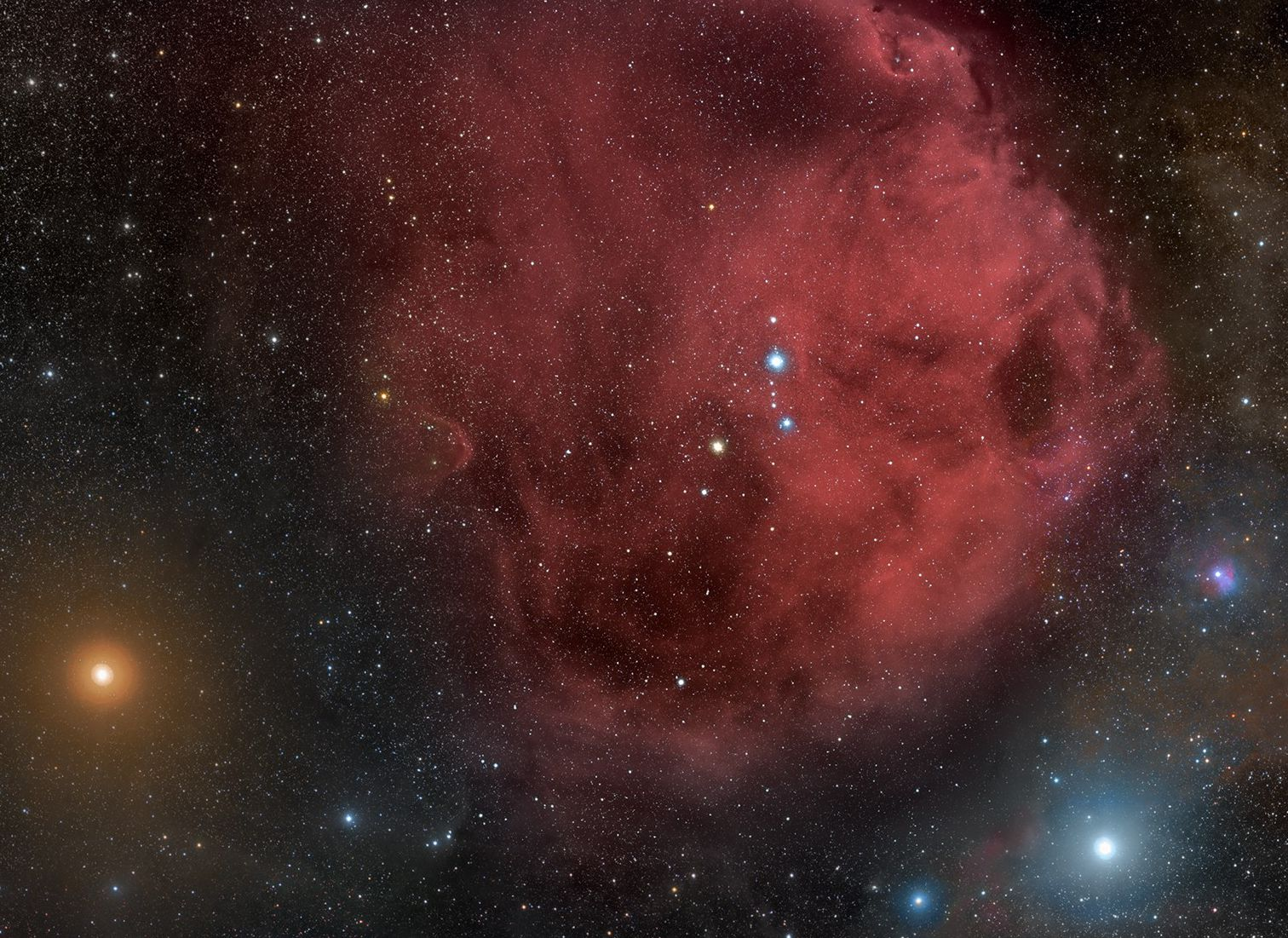
In this visible-light image of the λ Orionis ring (Sh2-264), HD 34989 is visible near the right-hand border, above the brilliant star Bellatrix (γ Orionis).

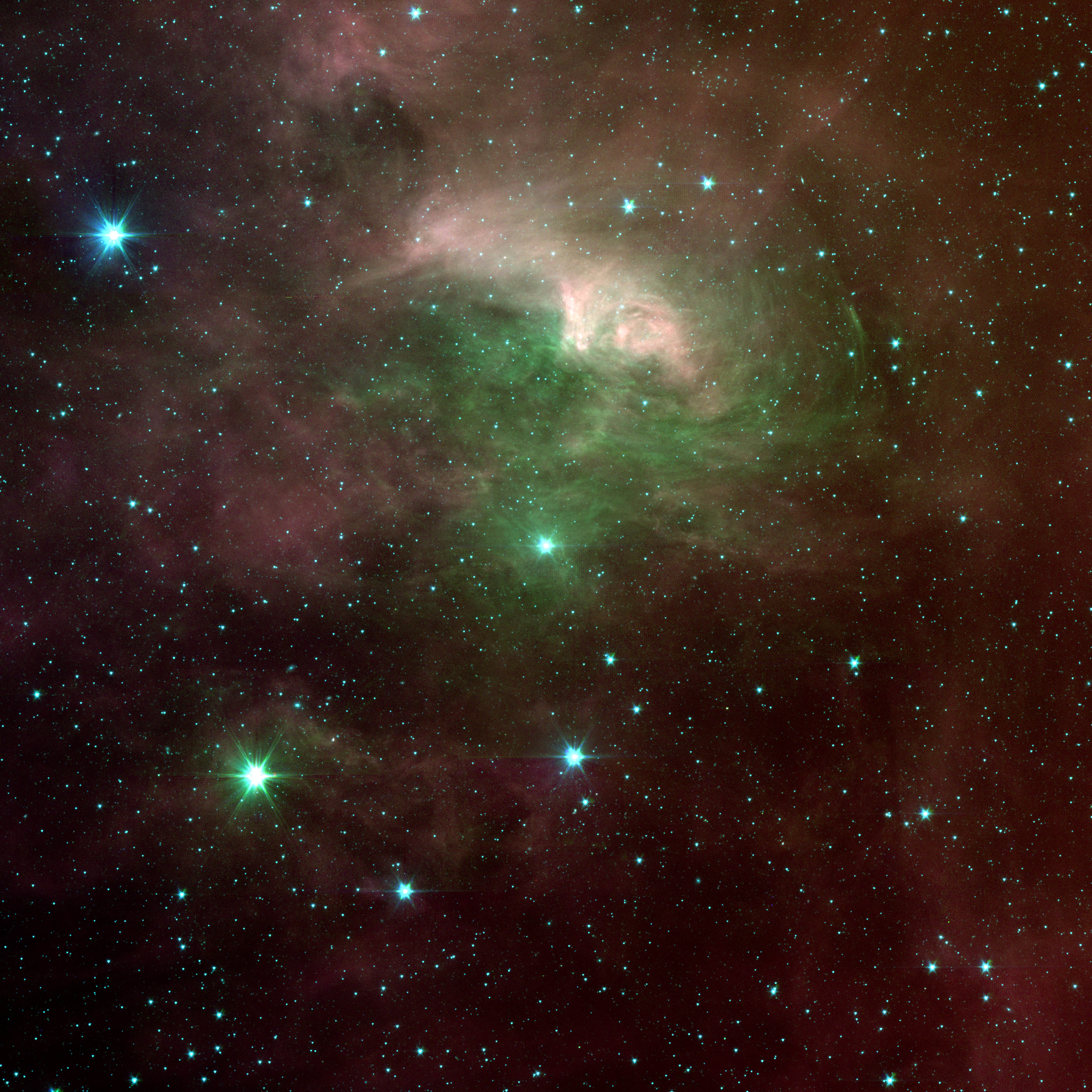
HD 34989 in the center, shown at infrared wavelengths with the Spitzer Space Telescope.

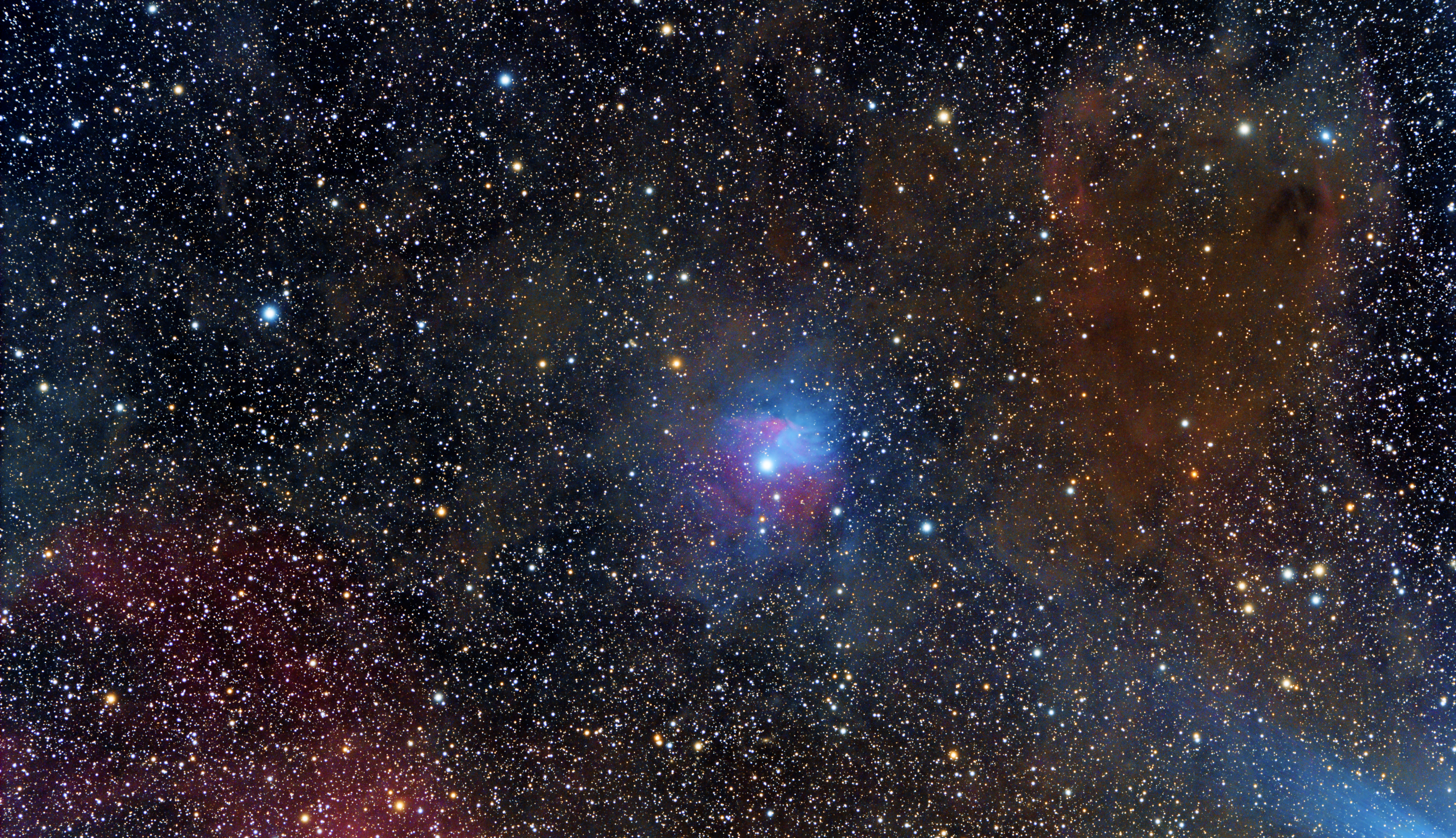
HD 34989 and its nebulosity
