= Chozhikali =

Indian folk dance

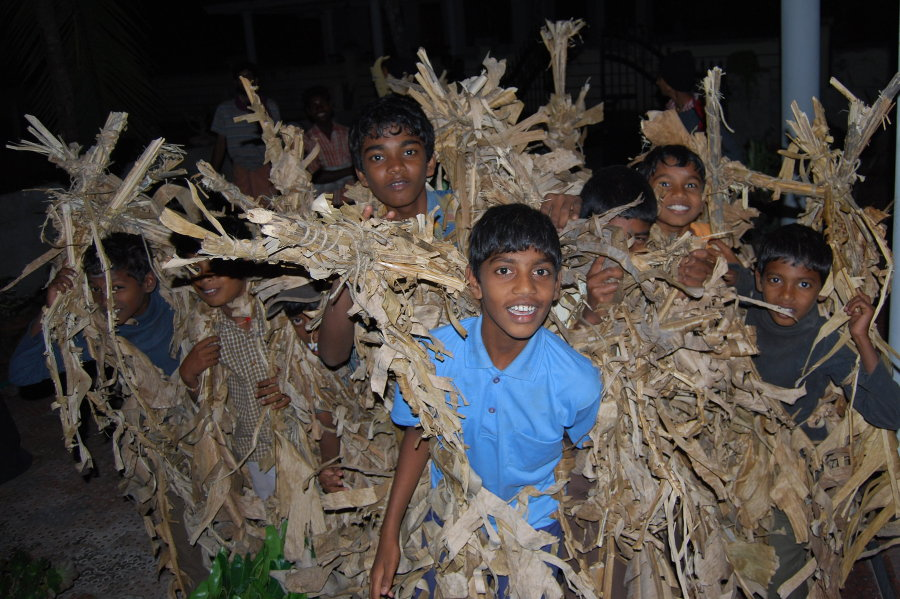
- Children performing Chozhikali
- Native name: ചോഴികളി (Malayalam)
- Genre: Indian folk dance
- Instrument(s): Chenda, Elathalam
- Origin: Kerala, India

Chozhikali, also spelled as Chozhi Kali, is a folk dance popular in Central Kerala, India. There are two types of Chozhikali: Thiruvathirachozhi and Kudachozhi. It is performed by the Hindu community in Palakkad and Thrissur districts of Kerala.

== Overview ==
Chozhikali is a folk dance popular in central Kerala mainly in the Valluvanad region. There are two types of Chozhikali: Thiruvathirachozhi and Kudachozhi. Chozhikali is a ritual dance form performed by the Hindu community of present-day Palakkad and Thrissur districts.

== Thiruvathirachozhi ==
As part of Thiruvathira celebrations, Thiruvathirachozhi, a type of Chozhikali performed in house to house after midnight on the days of Makayiram and Thiruvathira nakshthra in the Malayalam month of Dhanu (December/January). Tiruvathirachozhi is now mostly performed in Thalappilli Taluk of Thrissur District and Ottapalam Taluk of Palakkad District in the central Kerala.

=== Myth ===
Chozhikali is believed to have started to please Parvati and is believed to be the dance of Lord Shiva's bhoothas (demons). Chozhi means bhootha. It is believed that after Lord Shiva burnt Kamadeva, women from all over the world came to Kailasa praying for Kamadeva's rebirth, and Lord Shiva told them that if they pray and observe vratha (fasting without sleep) on Shiva's birthday day, Tiruvathira, he will be reborn. It is believed that Chozhikali is when demons of Lord Shiva enter the houses to see if those taking the fast are sleeping at night. There are many songs associated with Chozhikali. This is the legend that is said in the chozhi song, Dhanumasathile Thiruvathira Bhagavante tirunalallo.

=== Costume ===
Chozhi's costumes are made of dried banana leaves and other dry leaves tied to their bodies. Usually, children dress up as chozhi. More than 10 whole banana leaves are cut and tied together and placed on the head like a hat and then the rest part tied to the body and fixed. The leaves on the face are shifted to both sides and a mask of Areca palm petiole is placed, followed by banana shoots being tied around the arms and legs. There may be two horns protrude from the forehead. Apart from the Chozhi, there are characters like Yama Chitragupta and Muthi or Muthiyamma. They have their faces covered with charcoal written mask of Areca palm petiole. Chenda and elathalam are the background instruments in Chozhikali. It features Yama and Chitragupta trying to take Muthi to the afterlife and Muthi escaping from it.

Muthi's song is followed by dialogues with Yama. Chozhikali songs are mostly related to Ramayana and Mahabharata stories, apart from these there are also folk songs.

After finishing the performance the family will send the group away with rice, fruit, water, clothes and Dakshina (money).

== Kudachozhi ==
Kudachozhi also known as Visharikali is also a folk art form performed in Valluvanad region. It is traditionally performed by families of the Pulaya community. The song and step have been handed down to them for generations.

=== Costume and performance ===
Kudachozhi is performed by holding a palm leaf umbrella in one hand and a bamboo stick in the other as a sword and shield. The Chozhi used to come through fields that had been harvested in the Malayalam months of Meenam (March/April), Medam (April/May) and Idavam (May/June). After the harvest, Kudachozhi visits houses to bless people.

Chozhi in Kudachozhi is pasted with sandalwood paste on his face, chest, legs and hands. Each troupe of this art form performed by men consists of eight to twelve members. It starts from any of the place of deity in the region.

Chozhikali is performed by standing in a circle, spinning and waving the umbrella in their hands in a circle as the lead singer sings to the beat. Performance start slowly and then progress with brisk steps. The performance is completed by jumping high and taking rhythmic steps. The songs have a question-and-answer format.

Chozhi, demons of Goddess Parvati, are believed to be able to ward off heat illnesses and contagious diseases. The change of steps when the song and rhythm become tight is known as Kudakuthikali.

== Modern definition ==
The umbrella and broom used in Chozhikali are symbols of power. Chozhikali is now defined as a subaltern art that satirically recreates the world of inequalities experienced during feudal times.
