= Sh 2-264 =

Interstellar cloud in Orion

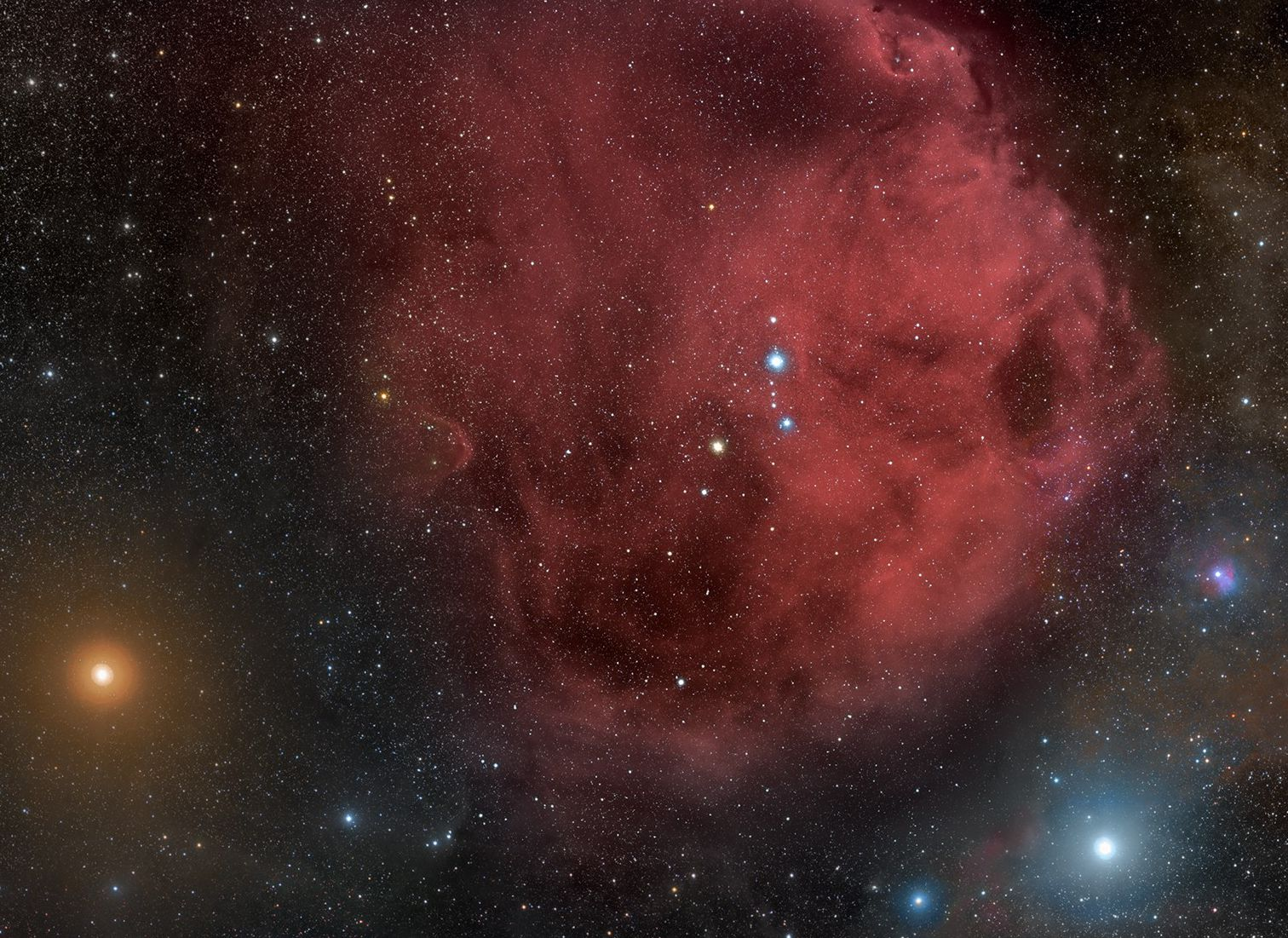
Lambda Ori Ring's molecular cloud, a type of star-forming zone in a nebula, is the main feature, made out at long exposure of usually over one minute, only, in visible light, in clear dry skies. Betelgeuse and Bellatrix are south-east and south-west of the formation, forever cast as Alpha and Gamma by Bayer, they are near the top of Orion and in myth represent the hunter's shoulders.

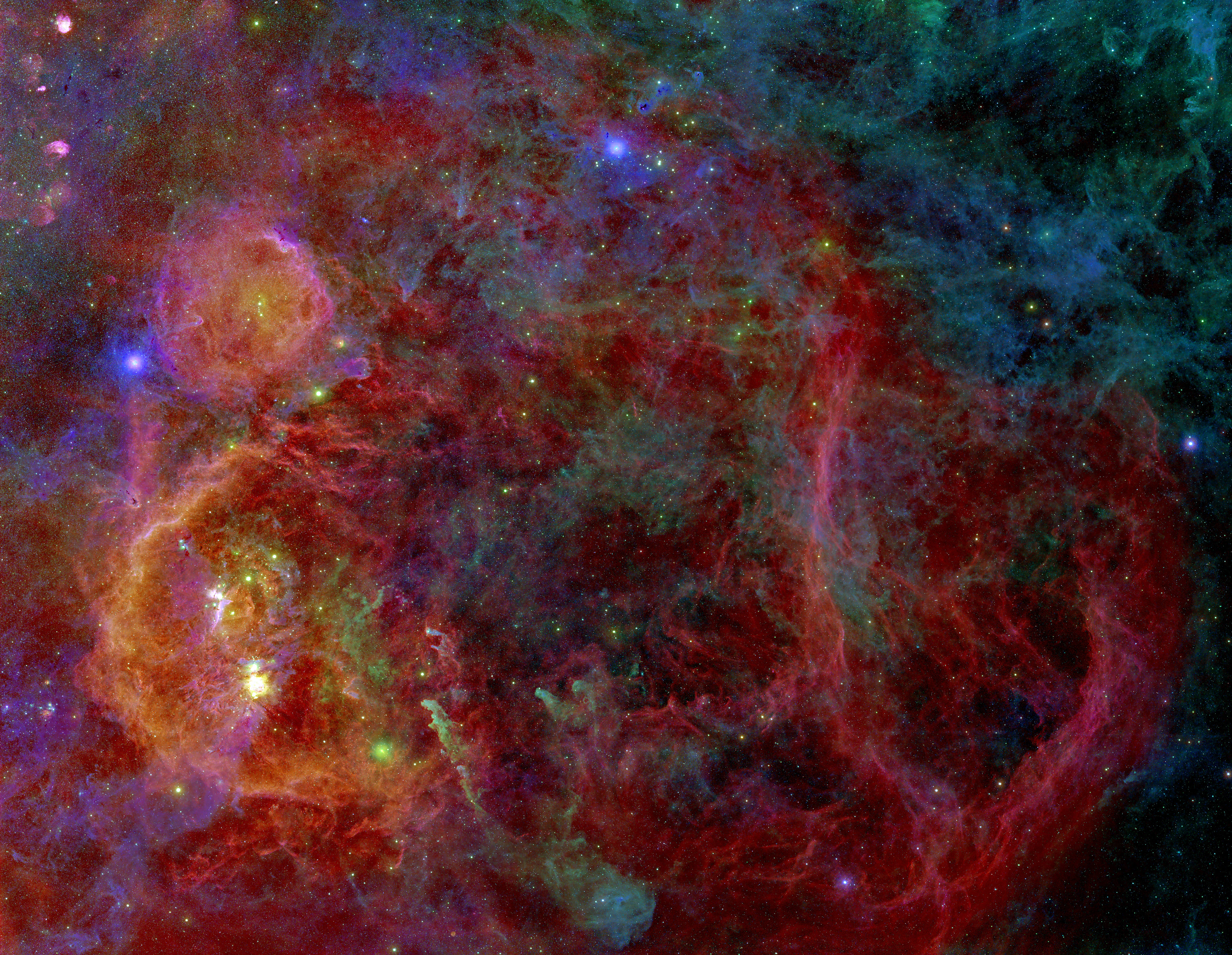
Lambda Orionis Nebula embedded within Molecular clouds, as imaged by the Northern Sky Narrowband Survey. Ionized hydrogen is mapped to red and while visual continuum to green and blue.

Sharpless 264, also known as the Lambda Orionis Ring, is a molecular cloud and H II region, which can be seen in the northern region of the Orion molecular cloud complex (OMCC), in the constellation of Orion. The OMCC is one of the best-known star formation regions and the closest sector of the Milky Way to the Solar System where high-mass stars are born. The nebula is named after its main star, λ Orionis, a blue giant responsible for the ionization of the surrounding material. It is also sometimes called the Angelfish Nebula due to its resemblance as to its lighter areas (pink to peach colour) to an angelfish. In the infrared its ionized boundaries are that which appears, instead.

== Observations ==
λ Orionis (also known as Meissa or Heka) at about 1,100 light-years is the star representing the head of Orion and can be found to the north of the quadrangle defined by the stars Betelgeuse, Bellatrix, Rigel and Saiph. This star can be found at the centre of open cluster Collinder 69 composed of fourth and fifth-magnitude young hot stars, visible to the naked eye. It can be resolved with a pair of binoculars. The rest of the cluster and associated nebula spans a few hundred light-years centred about 1400 light-years away.

The broad nebula shown is not visible unaided, with binoculars or small amateur telescopes. It becomes clear in long-exposure photographs, such as in the first illustration on this page.

Orange giant φ^{2} Orionis, while appearing to be surrounded by the Ring, is merely a foreground object at only about 116 light years from Earth.

HD 34989 is a blue-white main sequence star, visible magnified only, just outside the Ring. It has a small nebulous cloud more geared towards the near-infrared than other parts of the neighbouring ionized regions across the Ring.

== Gallery ==
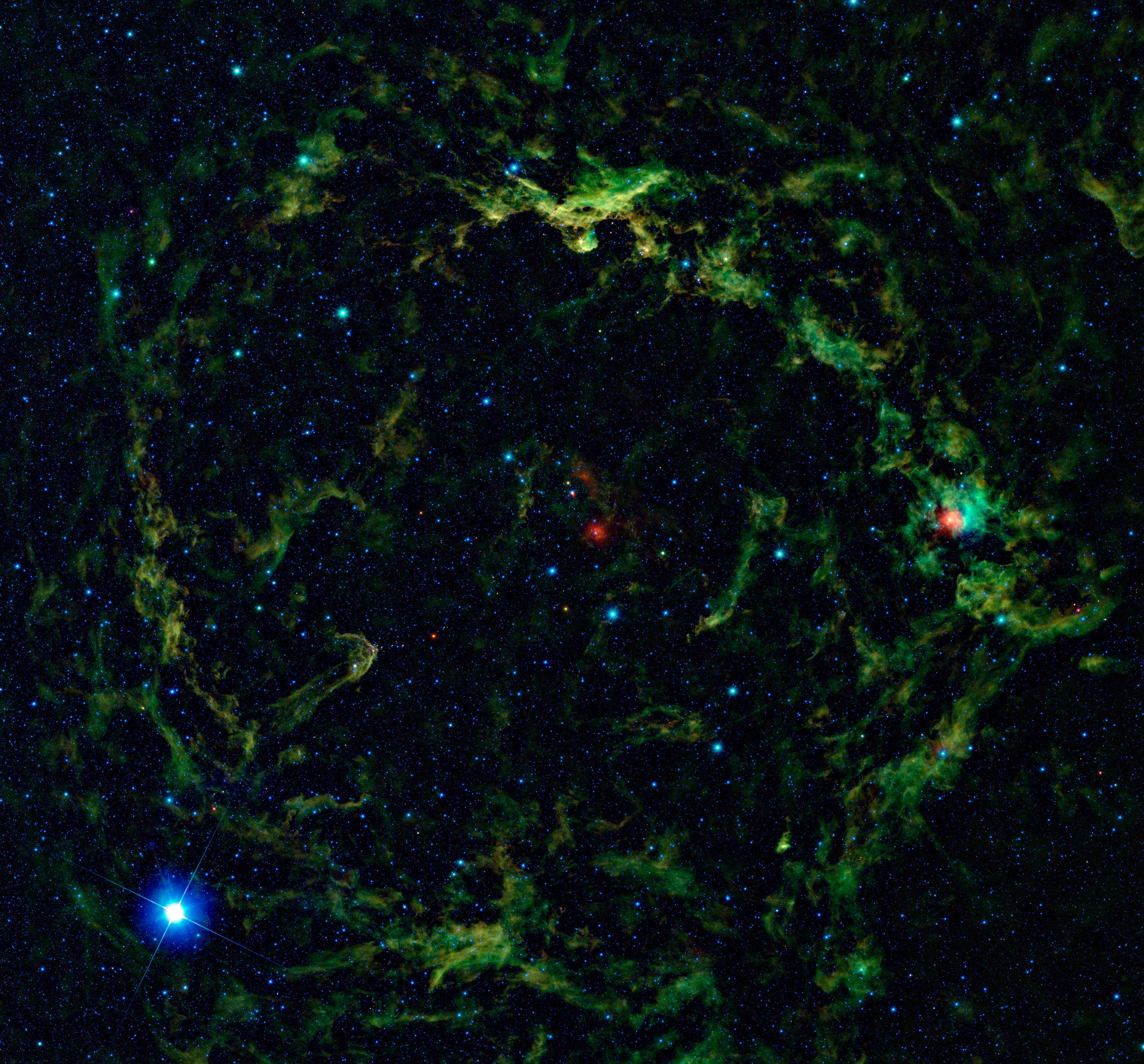
The ring shows its H II region status in the infrared — this image includes the very bright source of infrared and near-infrared Betelgeuse, therefore blue-white when shown converted to visible light.

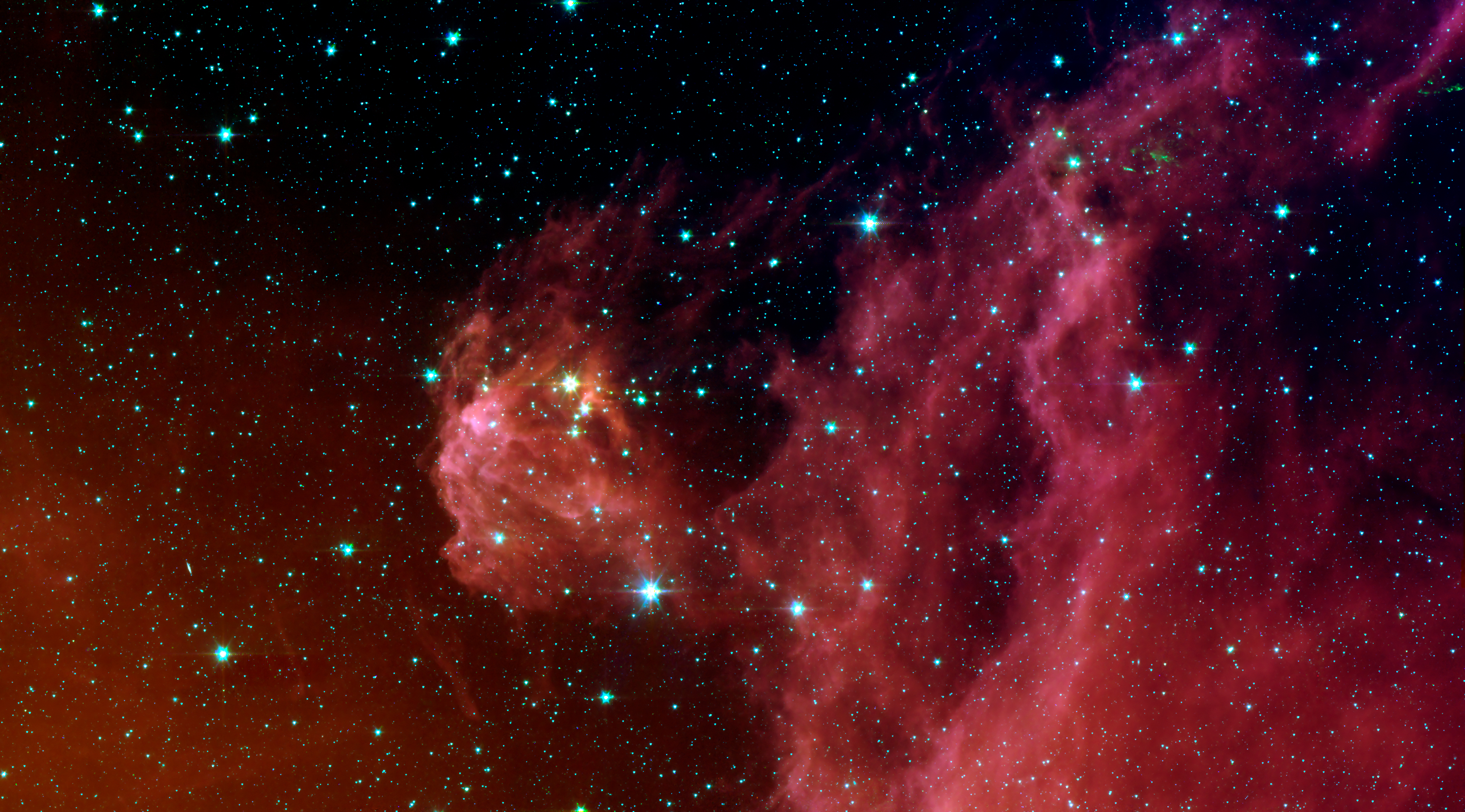
Barnard 30, a part of the Lambda Orionis Ring seen by the Spitzer Space Telescope. Young stars are forming in this region.

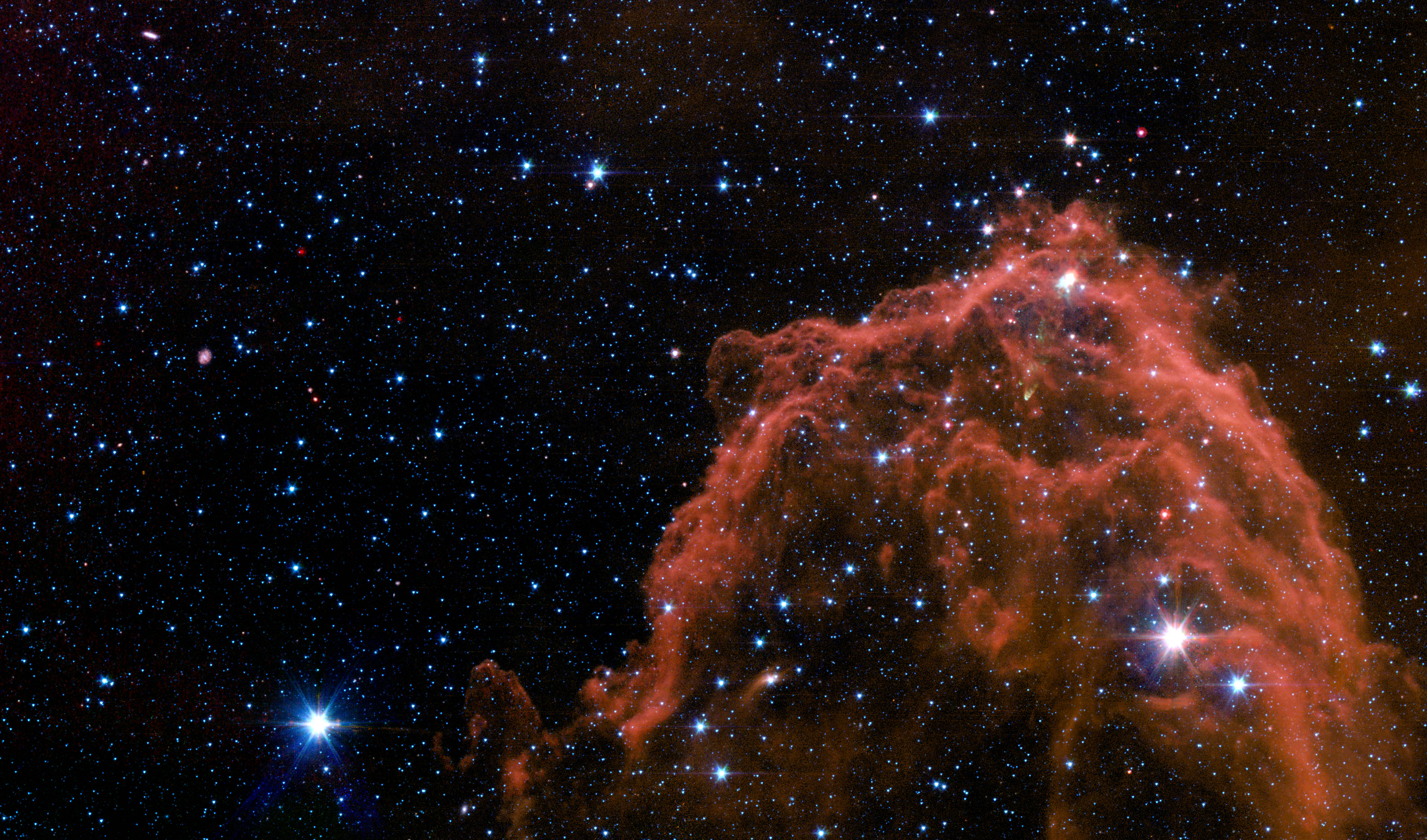
Barnard 35, a part of the Lambda Orionis Ring seen by the Spitzer Space Telescope. The Herbig-Haro Object HH 175 is part of this structure. The bright star on the lower right part of the image is FU Orionis.

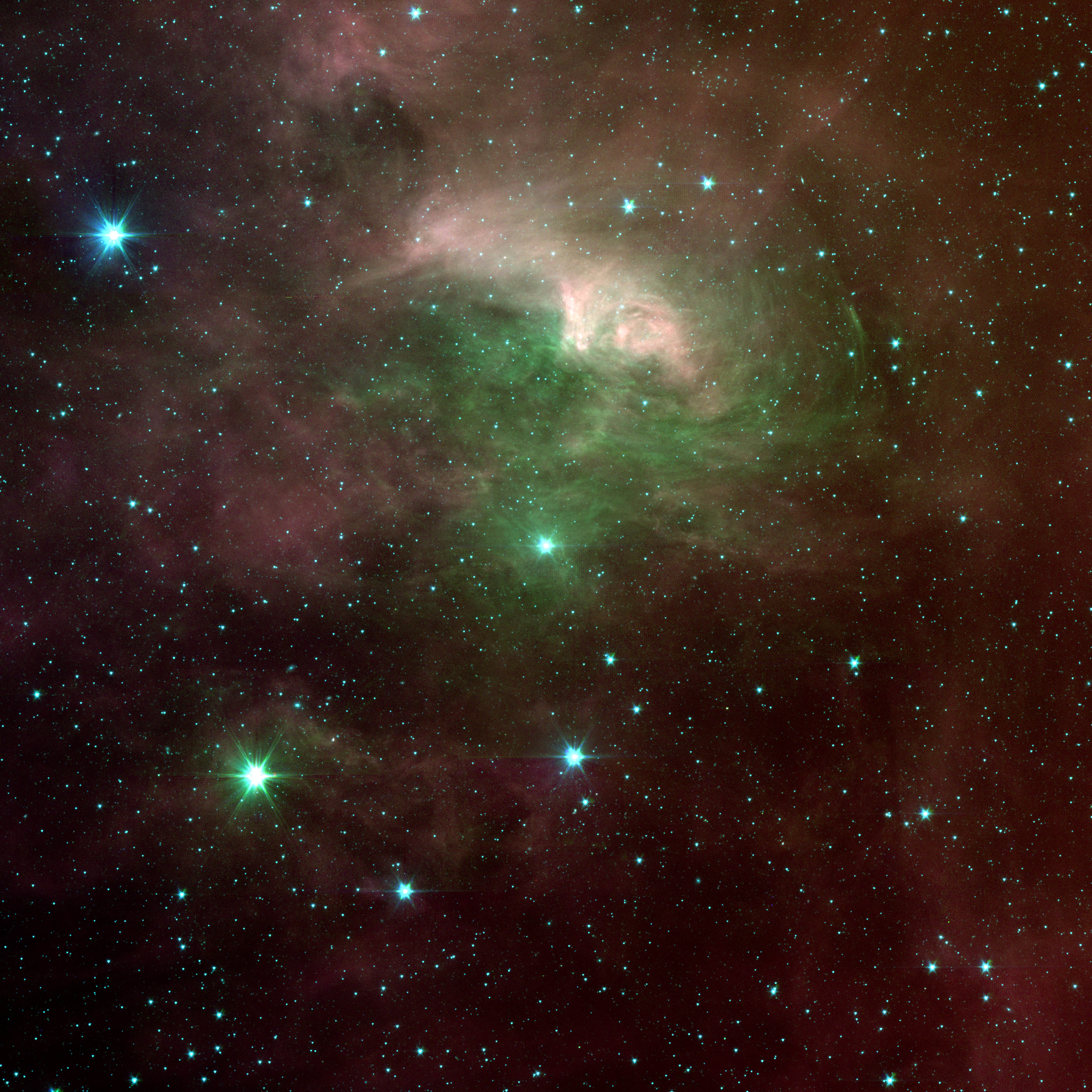
The star HD 34989 is surrounded by material that is part of the Lambda Orionis Ring. The images of this region were taken with the Spitzer Space Telescope.
