= Vrindavanam Venugopalan =

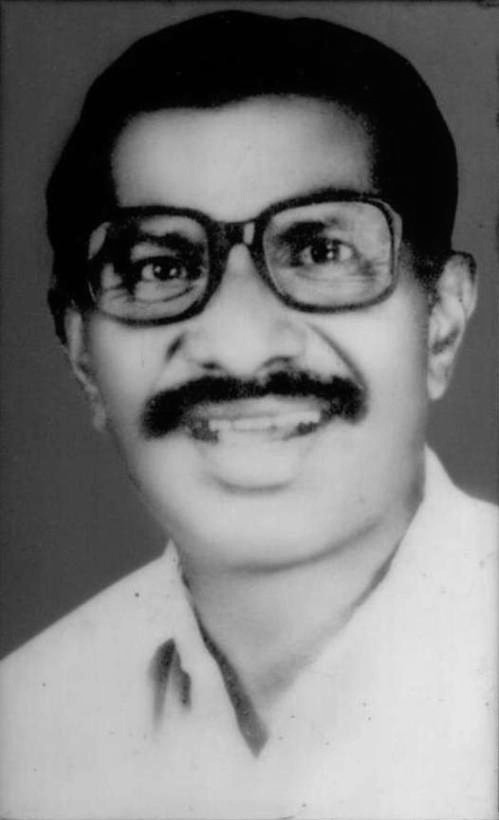
- Born: 24 October 1935; Kollam, Travancore
- Died: 25 December 2009 (aged 74); Kollam
- Education: M.A.(Mal), M.A.(Eng), M.A.(Soc), MEd.
- Spouse: M.K. Suguna Bai
- Children: 1 daughters and 4 sons.

Vrindavanam Venugopalan (24 October 1935 – 25 December 2009) was an Indian journalist, educationist and writer who wrote in both Malayalam and English. Venugopalan was the editor of Viswakeralam Daily, and an acclaimed biographer. He was also known as a pioneer in the family planning movement from its beginnings in Kerala in 1957. He published articles in leading newspapers on various subjects.

== Educational Background ==
Venugopalan completed his Intermediate from Sree Narayana College, Kollam joined the University College, Trivandrum and passed his B.A. (Hons) Degree with Distinction in 1960. Subsequently, he took his Masters Degree in English and Sociology from University of Kerala, He passed his BEd Degree with Gold Medal from Government Training College, Thiruvananthapuram and MEd Degree from University of Kerala. He underwent training in Extension Education, Audio-Visual Education, Mass Communication, Adult Education, Family Planning.

== As a Journalist ==
He was a frequent contributor to many dailies from 1950's. He started a Manuscript Monthly 'Vrindavanam' in 1952 from which he got his pen name Vrindavanam Venugopalan. He started another weekly 'Vidhyarthilokam' the same year. Great people like Mayyanad K. Damodaran B.A. appreciated his writings in this periodicals at that time. Later he worked with the Kaumudi Daily of K. Balakrishnan and the Pothujanam Eve Daily. He was Chief Editor of Prathichaya and was Mg. Editor of Viswakeralam Daily from 1980 to 1990. He was also Kerala Convenor of All India Small Newspapers Association.

== Government Service ==
Venugopalan started his career as a Clerk in the Health Services, Assistant in the Home Department of Govt Secretariat. Translator in National Employment Service, High School Teacher, Extension Educator in ESI Corporation, Trichur; F.P. Education Officer (FPAI); State Organizer of Association for Social Health and Moral Hygiene; He was also teacher in Government Victoria College, Palakkad He contested to the General Elections of 1965 to State Assembly as a Candidate from Trivandrum I Constituency having resigned the high post of State Health Educator (Senior Gazetted) of Family Planning Communication Research in the University of Kerala.

== Writer ==
Venugopalan had published books in Malayalam and English on different subjects. His books on Family Planning were highly commended by experts in the field. His biographies had a new style of narration which was new to the literary field. Some of his books were brought out with the forewords of Literary Magnete Dr. Sooranad Kunjan Pillai, Dr. P.K. Narayana Pillai ( Vice-Chancellor, Sree Sankara University, Kalady) Dr. C.O. Karunakaran, R. Ramachandran Nair I.A.S. and one of his book Communication Materials on Family Planning was brought out with a preface of the then Prime Minister Madam Indira Gandhi. His biography on K. Karunakaran was well received among masses.

== Books ==
- Kalayum Kavyavum – Literary Criticism, (1963)
- Swapnamgal – Short Stories (1963)
- Indulekhayum Saradayum – A Study (1964)
- Kutumbasamvidhanatinu Mumbu – Essays on F.P. (1964)
- Alankara Samskhepam – Gist of Poetics (1966)
- Vritha Samgraham – Prosody (1966)
- Laghu Vyakaranam – Grammar (1967)
- Pracharanopadhikal – Essays on F.P. (1969)
- Communication Materials on F.P. – (1969)
- Vishadangale Vida – Essays on F.P. (1979)
- K.P. Vallon Smaranika – Biography (1981)
- Thrimanan – Study on Bureaucracy (1986)
- Abudabi – Novel (1986)
- Gandeevam – Biography (1986)
- K. Karunakaran – Biography (1992)
- Y.S. Raja Reddy – Biography (1992)
- Gateway to English Grammar (1994)
