= Chimmanakali =

Indian folk art form

Chimmanakali is an art form traditional to the Pulaya tribe of north Kerala, South India. Chimmanam translates roughly to humor or chat. Chimmanakali is associated with Garbhabali, also known as Kannal Kalampattu. The song sung for this play is known as chothiyum pidiym pattu. The performers often make humorous speeches. The events are dramatized and presented. Chimmanakali is a satirical form of art performed to point out evils of society.

== See also ==
- Pulayan
- Arts of Kerala
- Kerala Folklore Academy
