= K. P. Vallon =

Indian social reformer

- Born: 2 January 1894; Mulavukadu Village, Ernakulam
- Died: 14 April 1940; Ernakulam
- Occupation: Community activist

Kolote P. Vallon (2 January 1900 – 14 April 1940) was a social reformer and leader of the Pulaya community in the Cochin State of Kerala. Along with Pandit Karuppan and Chanchan, he played a transformative role in the upliftment of the Pulaya community in Cochin.

== Member of the Legislative Council ==
Vallon was a two time member of the Cochin Legislative Council, the Maharaja of Cochin having nominated him in 1931 and 1939. He used the platform to champion the cause of the Depressed Classes and labourers. He introduced a resolution seeking government help to students of the Depressed Classes, which the government accepted.

== Commemoration ==
The K P Vallon Road connecting Kadavanthra Junction to Kadavanthra, in Kochi is named after him. Vrindavanam Venugopalan edited and published a life sketch on Vallon in 1981 which was published by Viswakeralam Daily.
