= Chachipunna =

- village
- Location in Kerala, India Chachipunna (India)
- Coordinates: 9°5′0″N 76°54′0″E
- Country: India
- State: Kerala
- District: Kollam

Languages
  - Official: Malayalam, English
- Time zone: UTC+5:30 (IST)
- Vehicle registration: KL- 25, 80

Chachipunna is a small village in the Kollam (Quilon) district of India's Kerala state with a population of approximately 1000.

== Geography ==
The village is situated 6 km southeast of Pathanapuram and 12 km northwest of Punalur, and it is considered a part of a bigger village, Punnala. It is surrounded by hills on north and south and a tributary of Kallada river flows through the village. It is connected by roads to Pathanapuram and Punalur. An aerial view of the village is available at Wikimapia.

== History ==
Ruins of an ancient Hindu temple and houses indicate that an earlier civilization existed probably 500 to 1000 years ago. According to folk stories, the people who lived here earlier were either killed by or fled away from invaders from Tamil Nadu. These invaders were known as Thee-Vetti-Kollakkar, or attackers with fire and swords.

There is also evidence of a much older civilization in the area: swords were discovered from a burial site, which was built using granite slabs, in the 1970s, and urns or nannangadis were also found in the 1980s. These discoveries can be linked to the megalithic civilization flourished in Kerala between the 10th century BC and 5th century AD.

Most of the Christian families living here migrated from places like Kozhencheri, Kumbanadu, and Thiruvalla 50 to 70 years ago. The stones (vettu-kallu) from the ruined houses of the earlier civilization were used by some of the families to build their first homes.

== Demographics ==
The majority of the senior inhabitants are farmers; main crops are rubber, paddy (rice), coconut, and black pepper. A good percentage of young men work in cities of North India and Middle East. The money sent back home by these emigrants brings prosperity to the village. Some of the problems the village faces are poverty, lack of industrial work, and alcoholism among men.

== Institutions ==
The village has a primary school (Marthoma School), a bank (State Bank of India), a public library

== Modern Medical Clinic ==
This village has a homeopathic clinic and a medical clinic -Kappithottathil Clinic & Lab.

== Religions ==
The villagers follow Christian, Hindu and Muslim faiths. The village has four Churches, majority of Christians belongs to Mar Thoma Syrian Church and Pentecostal denominations, a Hindu Temple, a mosque and a Madrasa.

== Small Scale Industry ==
This village has a small scale industry Koopil Sawmill.
