= Phi1 Orionis =

Binary star system in the constellation Orion

φ^{1} Orionis
- φ^{1} (circled) in the constellation Orion

Observation data Epoch J2000.0 Equinox J2000.0 (ICRS)
- Constellation: Orion
- Right ascension: 05^{h} 34^{m} 49.23804^{s}
- Declination: +09° 29′ 22.4878″
- Apparent magnitude (V): 4.42

Characteristics
- Spectral type: B0 III
- U−B color index: −0.97
- B−V color index: −0.15

Astrometry
Radial velocity (R_{v})	+33.2 km/s
Proper motion (μ)	RA: +0.27 mas/yr Dec.: −2.26 mas/yr
Parallax (π)	3.00±0.25 mas
Distance	1,090 ± 90 ly (330 ± 30 pc)
Absolute magnitude (M_{V})	−3.53±0.30

Orbit
Period (P)	3,068.03 d
Eccentricity (e)	0.22
Periastron epoch (T)	2418051.8 JD
Argument of periastron (ω) (secondary)	105°
Semi-amplitude (K_{1}) (primary)	13.3 km/s

Details
Mass	15.5±1.1 M_{☉}
Radius	6.3±1.0 R_{☉}
Luminosity	28,840 L_{☉}
Surface gravity (log g)	4.05±0.10 cgs
Temperature	30,000±300 K
Rotational velocity (v sin i)	20 km/s
Age	7.2±0.8 Myr

Other designations
- φ^{1} Ori, 37 Orionis, BD+09°877, FK5 208, HD 36822, HIP 26176, HR 1876, SAO 112914.

Database references
SIMBAD	data

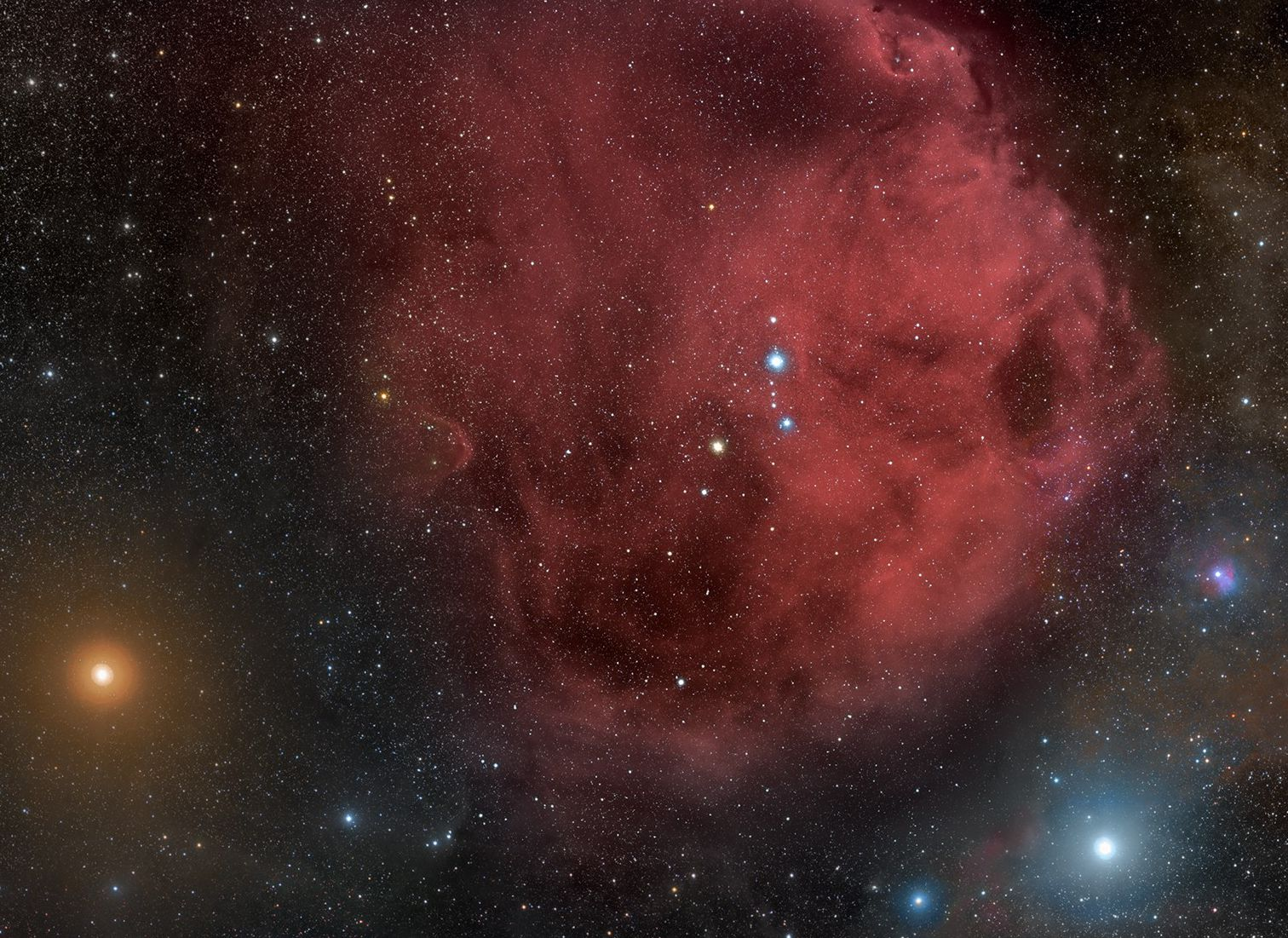
φ^{1} Orionis with nebulosity west of φ^{2} Orionis and south of λ Orionis

Phi^{1} Orionis is a binary star system in the constellation Orion, positioned less than a degree to the south of Meissa. It is visible to the naked eye with an apparent visual magnitude of 4.42. The distance to this system, based upon an annual parallax shift of 3.0 mas, is around 1,090 light-years.

This is a single-lined spectroscopic binary star system with an orbital period of 3,068 days and an eccentricity of 0.22. It is a member of the young Lambda Orionis cluster and is roughly 7 million years old. The primary component is a B-type giant star with a stellar classification of B0 III. It has over 15 times the mass of the Sun and around 6.3 times the Sun's radius. Nothing is known about the secondary companion. It does not contribute a significant amount of light to the combined spectrum.

== See also ==
- Phi^{2} Orionis
