= Barnard 35 =

Dark Nebula in Orion

Nebula
- Dark nebula
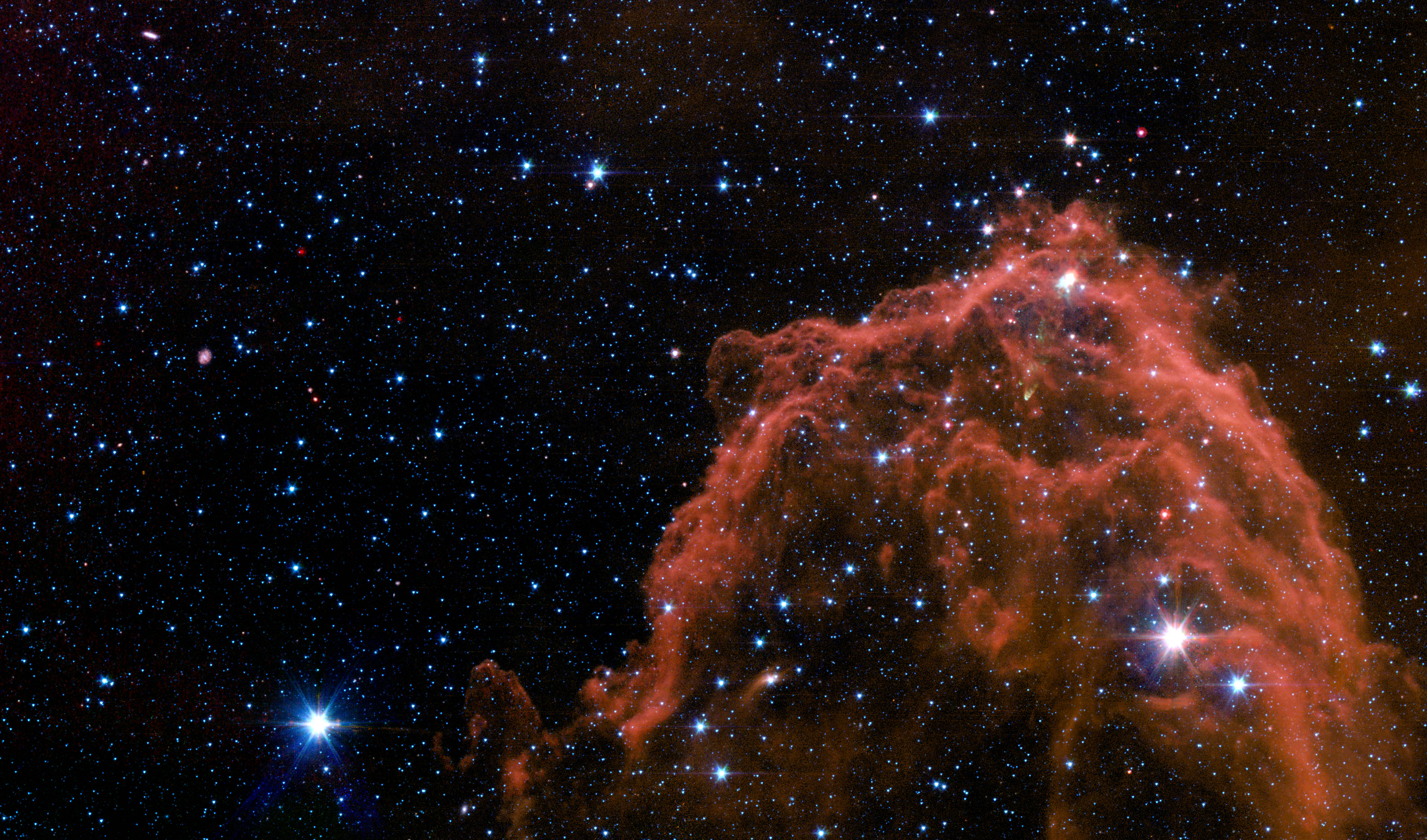
- Spitzer Space Telescope image of Barnard 35

Observation data: J2000.0 epoch
- Right ascension: 05^{h} 45^{m} 30.00^{s}
- Declination: +09° 03′ 0.0″
- Distance: 1,500 ly
- Constellation: Orion
- Designations: Barnard 35

Barnard 35 is a dark nebula located in the constellation of Orion. It is a dense interstellar cloud of dust and gas that obscures the light from background stars, appearing as a prominent dark nebula against the brighter nebular regions of the Lambda Orionis Ring (also known as Sh 2-264). Discovered by astronomer E. E. Barnard in the early 20th century, Barnard 35 is part of the larger Orion molecular cloud complex and is associated with active star formation triggered by nearby massive stars.

== Observation and Characteristics ==
Barnard 35 is classified as a dark absorption nebula, primarily composed of cold molecular hydrogen, carbon monoxide (CO), and dust grains. Observations in far-infrared and submillimeter wavelengths, such as those from the Spitzer Space Telescope, reveal embedded young stellar objects and protostars otherwise hidden by the opaque dust. The dust temperature is around 10 K, while the molecular gas is slightly warmer at approximately 23 K, indicating non-equilibrium heating mechanisms dominated by external radiation rather than internal collisions.
