= Lambda Orionis Cluster =

Open star cluster in the constellation Orion

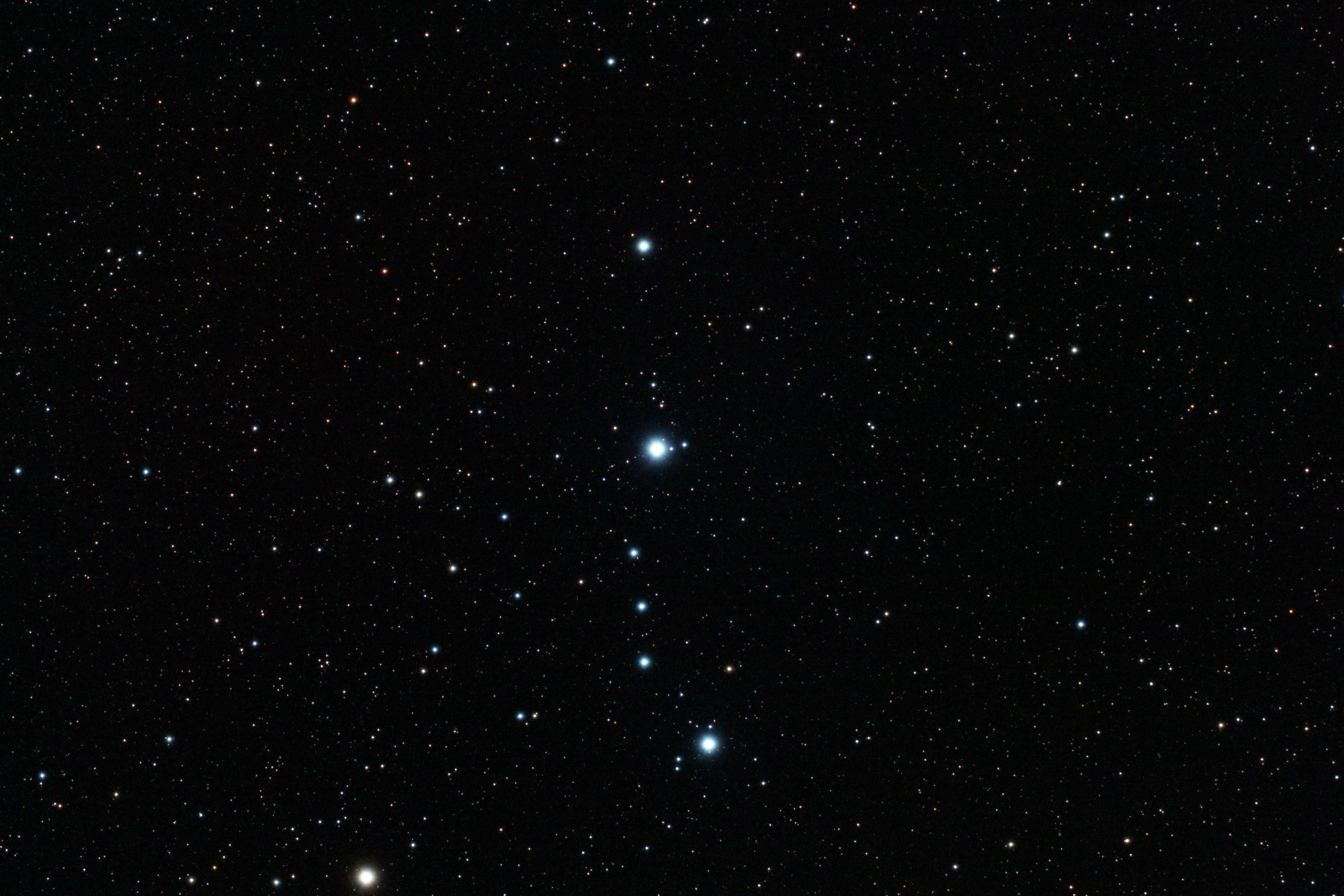

Observation data (J2000 epoch)
- Right ascension: 05^{h} 35^{m} 06^{s}
- Declination: +09° 56.0′
- Distance: 1,300 ly (400 pc)
- Apparent magnitude (V): 2.8

Physical characteristics
- Estimated age: 5.0 Myr
- Other designations: Lambda Ori Association, Collinder 69

Associations
- Constellation: Orion

The Lambda Orionis Cluster (also known as Collinder 69 or Aunt Margaret's Mirror) is an open star cluster located north-west of the star Betelgeuse in the constellation of Orion. It is about five million years old and roughly 1,300 ly (400 pc) away from the Sun. Included within the cluster is the double star Meissa (Lambda Orionis). With the rest of Orion, it is visible from the middle of August in the morning sky, to late April before Orion becomes too close to the Sun to be seen well. It can be seen from both the Northern Hemisphere and the Southern Hemisphere.

== Description ==
The cluster is following an orbit through the Milky Way that has a period of 227.4 million years with an ellipticity of 0.06, carrying it as far as 28 kly (8.6 kpc) from the Galactic Center, and as close as 25 kly (7.7 kpc). The inclination of the orbit carries it up to 260 light-years (80 parsecs) away from the galactic plane. On average it crosses the plane every 33.3 million years.

The star cluster is young and contains a large number of low-mass stars, some T Tauri stars and brown dwarfs. One notable member is LOri167, which is a wide binary consisting of a potential planetary-mass object and a brown dwarf. Observations of the star cluster with the Spitzer Space Telescope have shown that 25% of the low-mass stars and 40% of the substellar objects are surrounded by a circumstellar disk. Two of these being actively photoevaporated by Meissa.

A chain of three stars between magnitudes 6.7 and 7.7 that lie between Meissa and Phi^{1} Orionis consists of, in order of higher to lower declination, HD 36894, HD 245203, and HD 36895.

== Molecular ring and cluster evolution ==
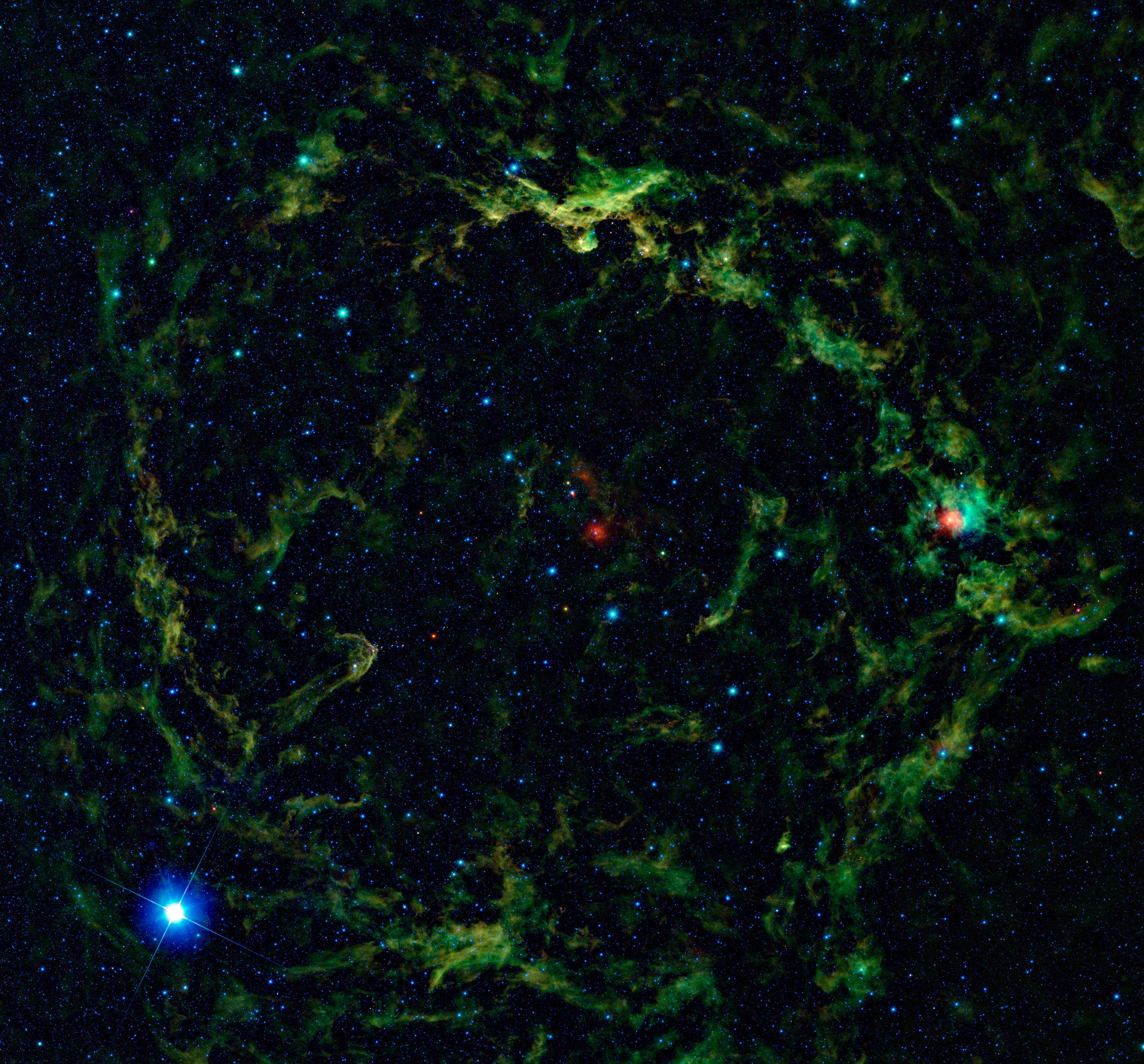
Molecular Ring in infrared as seen by WISE

The cluster might have formed in the central region of an elongated cloud, which is supported by the distribution of pre-main-sequence star candidates, which are concentrated in the cluster and nearby regions in an elongated shape. Massive OB stars and low-mass stars formed in the central regions of these clouds. The low-mass stars closest to the massive stars likely lost their circumstellar disks due to photoevaporation. Many low-mass stars parsecs away were unaffected by this and represent the current population of low-mass stars with a circumstellar disk. The cluster is surrounded by a large molecular ring, called the Lambda Orionis ring. This was interpreted as a remnant of a supernova that exploded one million years ago. The supernova blast encountered the clouds and gas in the region and the blast dispersed the parent core, creating the molecular ring.

== See also ==
Other celestial bodies included in the constellation Orion:

- Orion Nebula
- Horsehead Nebula
- Barnard 30
