= Srikumar Rao =

Shreekumar Rai

Srikumar S. Rao
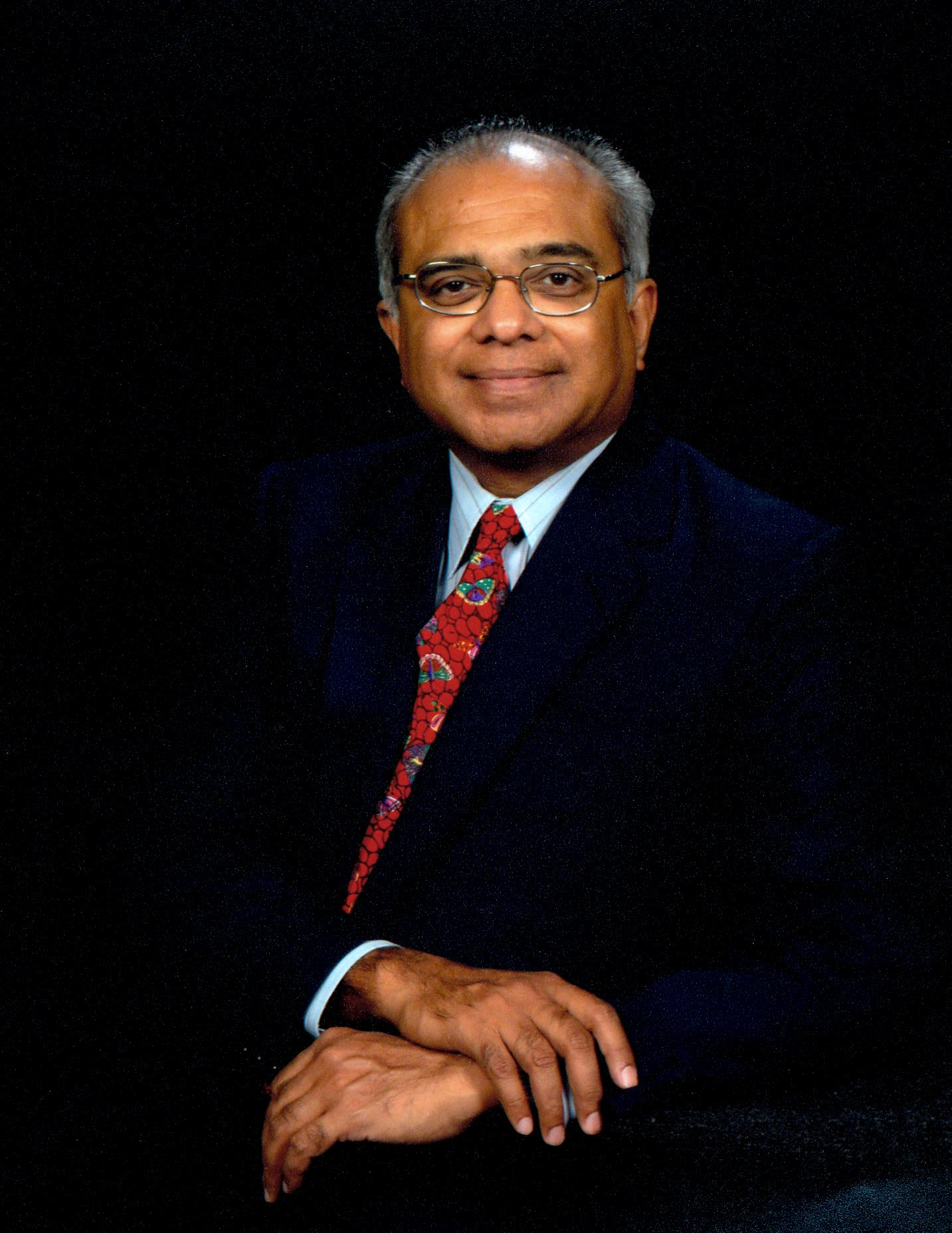
- Born: 11 April 1951 (age 75); Bombay, India
- Education: Columbia Business School; Indian Institute of Management, Ahmedabad; St. Stephen's College, Delhi University
- Occupations: Organizational Consultant & Executive Educator; Author; Professor; Speaker
- Organization: The Rao Institute
- Spouse: Meena Rao
- Website: www.theraoinstitute.com

Srikumar S. Rao (born 11 April 1951) is the founder of The Rao Institute and a coach for executives and entrepreneurs who are spiritually inclined.

He is a TED speaker and works with professionals and global corporations like Google and Microsoft.

He is a former business school professor and creator of Creativity and Personal Mastery (CPM), a course designed to effect personal transformation. He has authored Are You Ready to Succeed: Unconventional Strategies for Achieving Personal Mastery in Business and Life, which is an international best seller, and Happiness at Work: Be Resilient, Motivated and Successful – No Matter What, a bestseller on Inc.'s "The Business Book Bestseller List."

His book Modern Wisdom, Ancient Roots: The Movers and Sheker’s Guide to Unstoppable Success was an Amazon bestseller. His latest book The Seventh Jar – Your Path to Personal Mastery and Success was published by Bloomsbury in 2025.

He is also the creator and narrator of the audio-course The Personal Mastery Program.

== Biography ==
Rao was born in Bombay (current day Mumbai) in 1951, and received his schooling in Delhi, Rangoon and Kolkata. He graduated from Narendrapur, the flagship school of the Ramakrishna Mission system in West Bengal. He was a physics major at St. Stephen's College, Delhi University, and subsequently obtained an MBA from the Indian Institute of Management, Ahmedabad. Rao then came to the United States as a doctoral student and obtained a Ph.D. in marketing from Columbia Business School, New York in 1980.

== Career ==
Rao was an executive at Warner Communications from 1973 to 1975. He worked on the advertising strategy for The Exorcist. From 1977 to 1978, Rao was a financial executive in the mergers and acquisition division of the Continental Group. Rao moved to Data Resources, Inc. in 1978, and was promoted to head their marketing research department. He continued in that position when DRI was acquired by McGraw-Hill, and went over to academia in 1983.

Rao was a marketing professor at Baruch College, City University of New York from 1983 to 1985. He then taught at the C.W. Post campus of Long Island University, where he was appointed the Louis and Johanna Vorzimer Professor of Marketing. He was a contributing editor for Success, Financial World and Forbes, and has written hundreds of articles for these publications and others such as Inc., Training and Hemispheres.

His article "The Shape of Leadership to Come" was recognized as a "Citations of Excellence Top 50 Papers" winner by Emerald Management Reviews in 2009.

== Academia career ==
In 1994, Rao created and began teaching a course known as Creativity and Personal Mastery (CPM) at Long Island University. He moved the course to Columbia Business School in 1999 and taught CPM at Columbia until 2005. He has also taught CPM at London Business School, the Kellogg School of Management at Northwestern University and the Haas School of Business at the University of California at Berkeley.

Rao currently teaches Creativity and Personal Mastery privately, in major cities including New York, San Francisco and London, and in corporate settings. CPM has had its own alumni association since it was a course at Columbia.

Training magazine described the course in its Leadership issue of May/June 2012.

== Personal ==
Rao is married to Meena Rao, the Director of Organic Chemistry Laboratories at Barnard College, Columbia University.

== Selected publications ==
- Rao, Srikumar S. (2006). Are you ready to succeed? unconventional strategies for achieving personal mastery in business and life (1st ed.). New York: Hyperion. ISBN 978-1-4013-0193-4.
- Rao, Srikumar (1 January 2008). The Personal Mastery Program: Discovering Passion and Purpose in Your Life and Work. Sounds True. ISBN 9781591799481.
- Rao, Srikumar S. (2010). Happiness at work: be resilient, motivated, and successful--no matter what. New York: McGraw-Hill. ISBN 978-0-07-166432-5.
- Rao, Srikumar (4 October 2022). Modern Wisdom, Ancient Roots: The Movers and Shakers' Guide to Unstoppable Success. River Grove Books. p. 248. ISBN 978-1632995414.
- Rao, Srikumar (18 January 2025). The Seventh Jar: Your Path to Personal Mastery and Success. Bloomsbury India. p. 192. ISBN 978-9361310317.
