= Punnala =

- village
- Location in Kerala, India Punnala (India)
- Coordinates: 9°5′3″N 76°55′3″E
- Country: India
- State: Kerala
- District: Kollam

Area
  - Total: 69.1 km^{2} (26.7 sq mi)

Population (2011)
  - Total: 12,104
  - Density: 175/km^{2} (454/sq mi)

Languages
  - Official: Malayalam, English
- Time zone: UTC+5:30 (IST)
- PIN: 689696
- Vehicle registration: KL-02,KL-25 KL 80
- District: Kollam
- Lok Sabha constituency: Mavelikkara
- Assembly Constituency: Pathanapuram

Punnala is a small village situated in Kollam district of Kerala, India. Punnala is located at a distance of 8 kilometers from both Pathanapuram and Punalur and 1 km from Chachipunna. It is in the Pathanapuram Taluk, Pathanapuram Assembly Constituency and Mavelikkara Parliament Constituency. Punnala is a part of Piravanthoor Grama Panchayth, Pathanapuram Block Panchayat and Kollam district Panchayat.

== History ==
It is said that the place was inhabited long back by civilized people but settlement has been demolished probably of an attack. The settlement was based at Kumaramkudy, which is under State farming Corporation of Kerala now. The remains of the old temple can be seen there.

== Geography ==
Punnala is located at 9.08264°N 76.914°E. The village is spread over an area of 69.1 km^{2}

== Demographics ==
As of 2011 census of India, Punnala had a population of 12,104. The total population constitute, 5,802 males and 6,302 females —a sex ratio of 1086 females per 1000 males. 1,167 children are in the age group of 0–6 years, of which 641 are boys and 522 are girls —a ratio of 841 female per 1000 male. The average literacy rate stands at 83.03% out of which 83.45% males & 82.64% females with 2,054 illiterates.

== Transport ==
The area is well connected to the rest of the state by bus services of KSRTC. The nearest railway stations are Punalur railway station and Avaneeswaram railway station

== Politics ==
Punnala Village is a part of the Mavelikkara Loksabha Constituency. Kodikunnil Suresh is the present member of parliament who won the 2024 Indian general election. Pathanapuram is assembly constituency and actor turned politician K. B. Ganesh Kumar is the current M. L. A. from Pathanapuram. He was the Minister of Forests, Sports & Cinema under UDF government.

There are Many political parties working in the village.

1. Indian National Congress
2. Communist Party of India (Marxist)
3. Communist Party of India
4. Bhartiya Janatha Party
5. Indian Union Muslim League
6. Kerala Congress (M) etc are some of them. Also there are different communal and religious organizations working in the region.

== Government Establishments ==
1. Government Higher Secondary School Punnala.
2. Government Homeo dispensary, Chachippunna.
3. Village office, Punnala.
4. Post Office, Punnala.
