= Punnala Sreekumar =

Indian social worker

- Born: Punnala, Kollam

Punnala Sreekumar is the general secretary of Kerala Pulayar Maha Sabha. He was re-elected during the 51st State Conference held at Kozhikode.
