= Phi2 Orionis =

Star in the constellation Orion

φ^{2} Orionis
- φ^{2} (circled) in the constellation Orion

Observation data Epoch J2000.0 Equinox J2000.0 (ICRS)
- Constellation: Orion
- Right ascension: 05^{h} 36^{m} 54.389^{s}
- Declination: +09° 17′ 26.42″
- Apparent magnitude (V): 4.081

Characteristics
- Evolutionary stage: Yellow giant
- Spectral type: G8 III-IV
- U−B color index: +0.618
- B−V color index: +0.966

Astrometry
Radial velocity (R_{v})	99.03±0.18 km/s
Proper motion (μ)	RA: +98.301 mas/yr Dec.: −305.022 mas/yr
Parallax (π)	28.6722±0.1859 mas
Distance	113.8 ± 0.7 ly (34.9 ± 0.2 pc)
Absolute magnitude (M_{V})	+1.33±0.07

Details
Mass	1.07±0.04 M_{☉}
Radius	8.45±0.06 R_{☉}
Luminosity	29.8±0.4 L_{☉}
Surface gravity (log g)	3.00±0.02 cgs
Temperature	4,703±11 K
Metallicity [Fe/H]	−0.56±0.02 dex
Rotational velocity (v sin i)	1.91±0.53 km/s
Age	6.91±1.04 Gyr

Other designations
- φ^{2} Ori, 40 Orionis, BD+09°898, HD 37160, HIP 26366, HR 1907, SAO 112958

Database references
SIMBAD	data

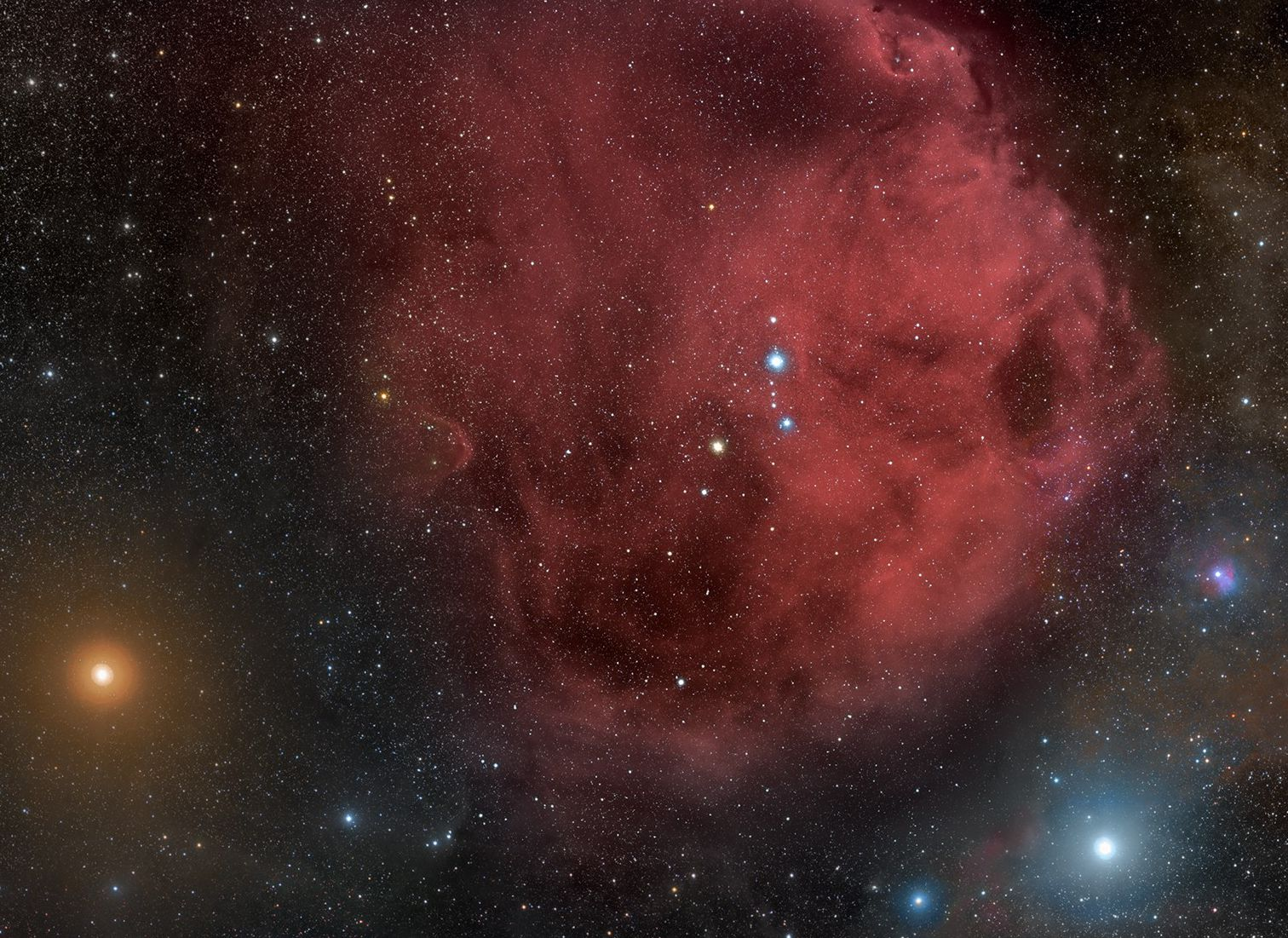
Yellow φ^{2} Orionis with nebulosity east of φ^{1} Orionis and south-east of λ Orionis

Phi^{2} Orionis is a star in the constellation Orion, where it forms a small triangle on the celestial sphere with the nearby Meissa and Phi^{1} Orionis. This star is visible to the naked eye with an apparent visual magnitude of 4.081. Based upon an annual parallax shift of 28.67 mas, it is located around 114 light-years from the Sun.

This is an evolved G-type star of stellar classification G8 III-IV, which means that it is in an evolutionary stage between a subgiant (IV) and a giant star (III). It is estimated to be 6.9 billion years old, has 1.07 times the mass of the Sun, but has expanded to 8 times the Sun's radius. The star shines with 30 times the solar luminosity from its outer atmosphere at an effective temperature of 4,700 K.
