= Meissa =

Star in the constellation Orion

- λ (circled) in the constellation Orion.

Observation data Epoch J2000 Equinox ICRS
- Constellation: Orion
- A
- Right ascension: 05^{h} 35^{m} 08.27608^{s}
- Declination: +09° 56′ 02.9913″
- Apparent magnitude (V): 3.7
- B
- Right ascension: 05^{h} 35^{m} 08.48130^{s}
- Declination: +09° 56′ 06.0995″
- Apparent magnitude (V): 5.6

Characteristics

A
- Spectral type: O9 III((f))
- U−B color index: −1.01
- B−V color index: −0.21

B
- Spectral type: B0 V
- U−B color index: −0.77
- B−V color index: +0.04

Astrometry
Radial velocity (R_{v})	+30.10 km/s

A
Proper motion (μ)	RA: +2.896 mas/yr Dec.: −3.183 mas/yr
Parallax (π)	2.5936±0.4032 mas
Distance	approx. 1,300 ly (approx. 390 pc)
Absolute magnitude (M_{V})	−4.25

B
Proper motion (μ)	RA: +2.216 mas/yr Dec.: −1.986 mas/yr
Parallax (π)	2.4682±0.1543 mas
Distance	1,320 ± 80 ly (410 ± 30 pc)
Absolute magnitude (M_{V})	−1.94

Details

A
Mass	34 M_{☉}
Radius	10.0±0.6 R_{☉}
Luminosity	200,000+117,000 −74,000 L_{☉}
Surface gravity (log g)	3.90 cgs
Temperature	36,000±900 K
Metallicity [Fe/H]	0.03 dex
Age	4.2 Myr

B
Mass	10.3±0.7 M_{☉}
Radius	4.2±0.8 R_{☉}
Luminosity	6,300 L_{☉}
Surface gravity (log g)	4.21±0.10 cgs
Temperature	25,400±500 K
Age	1.8 Myr

Other designations
- λ Orionis, 39 Orionis, 101 G. Orionis, BD+09°879, HIP 26207, SAO 112921
- A: HD 36861, HR 1879
- B: HD 36862, HR 1880

Database references
SIMBAD	λ Ori
- A
- B

Meissa /ˈmaɪsə/, designated Lambda Orionis (λ Orionis, abbreviated Lambda Ori, λ Ori) is a star system in the constellation of Orion. It is a binary star system approximately 1,300 ly away with a combined apparent magnitude of 3.33. The main components are an O9 giant star and a B-class main sequence star, separated by about 4″. Despite Meissa being more luminous and only slightly further away than Rigel, it appears 3 magnitudes dimmer at visual wavelengths, with much of its radiation emitted in the ultraviolet due to its high temperature.

== Nomenclature ==
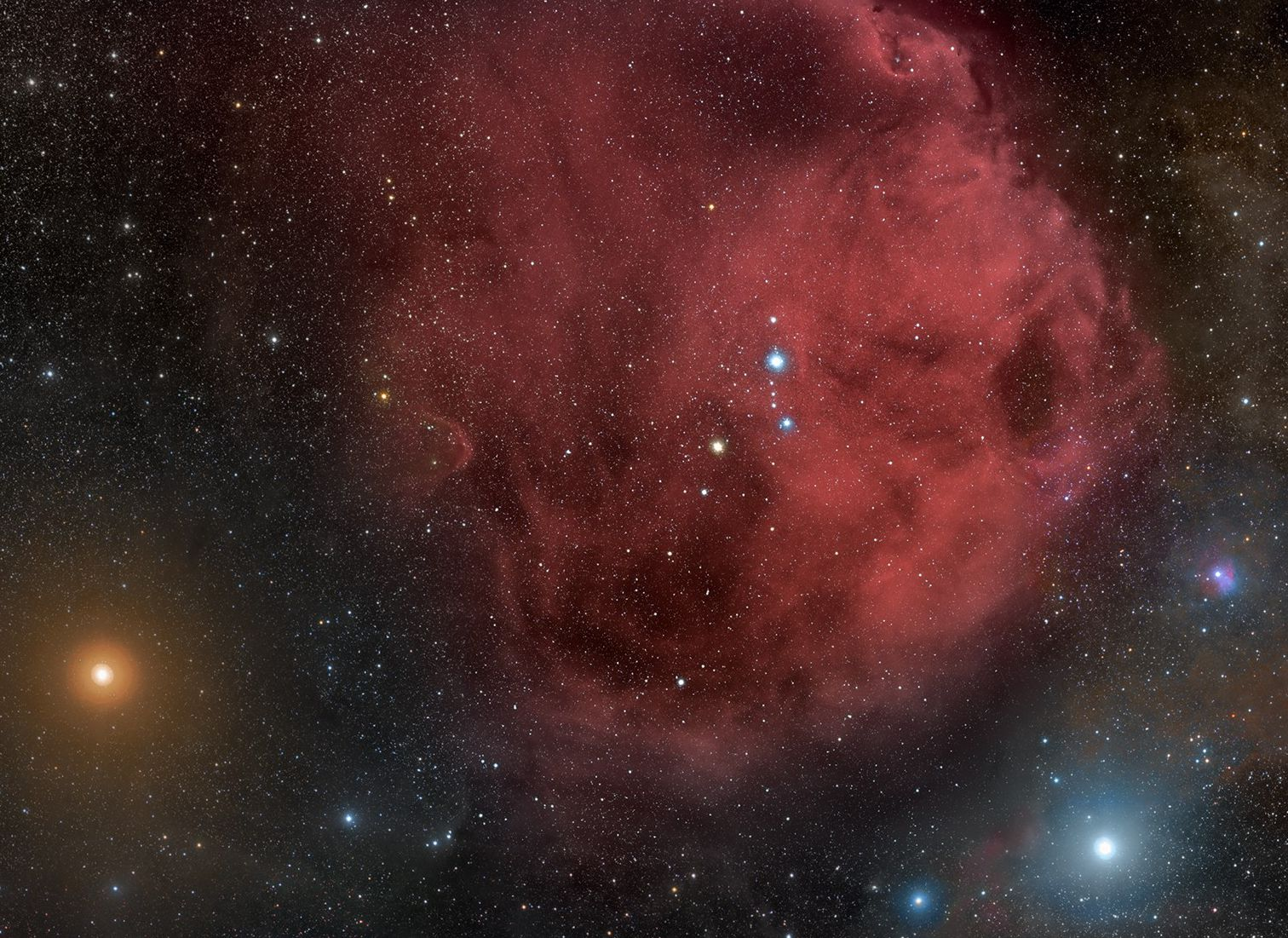
Meissa with nebulosity north of φ^{2} Orionis

Lambda Orionis is the star's Bayer designation. The traditional name Meissa derives from the Arabic Al-Maisan which means 'The Shining One'. Al-Maisan was originally used for Gamma Geminorum, but was mistakenly applied to Lambda Orionis and the name stuck. In 2016, the International Astronomical Union organized a Working Group on Star Names (WGSN) to catalog and standardize proper names for stars. The WGSN's first bulletin of July 2016 included a table of the first two batches of names approved by the WGSN; which included Meissa for Lambda Orionis A. It is now so entered in the IAU Catalog of Star Names.

The original Arabic name for this star, Al Hakah (the source for another name for it, Heka) refers to the Arabic lunar mansion that includes this star and the two of Phi Orionis (Al Haḳʽah, 'a White Spot'). In Chinese, 觜宿 (Zī Sù), meaning Turtle Beak, refers to an asterism consisting of Meissa and both of Phi Orionis Consequently, the Chinese name for Meissa itself is 觜宿一 (Zī Sù yī, English: the First Star of Turtle Beak.)

== Properties ==
Meissa is a giant star with a stellar classification of O9 III and an apparent visible magnitude 3.54. It is an enormous star with about 34 times the mass of the Sun and 10 times the Sun's radius. The outer atmosphere has an effective temperature of around 35,000 K, giving it the characteristic blue glow of a hot O-type star. Meissa is a soft X-ray source with a luminosity of 10^{32} erg s^{−1} and peak emission in the energy range of 0.2–0.3 keV, which suggests the X-rays are probably being generated by the stellar wind. The stellar wind of Meissa is well characterized by a mass-loss rate of 2.5×10^{−8} solar masses per year and a terminal velocity of 2,000 km/s.

Meissa is actually a double star with a companion at an angular separation of 4.41 arcseconds along a position angle of 43.12° (as of 1937). This fainter component is of magnitude 5.61 and it has a stellar classification of B0.5 V, making it a B-type main sequence star. There is an outlying component, Meissa C, which is an F-type main sequence star with a classification of F8 V. This star in turn may have a very low mass companion that is probably a brown dwarf.

In 2018, a companion was detected around Meissa A, with a project separation of 10.13 mas. However, it was not detected again.

== Ring ==
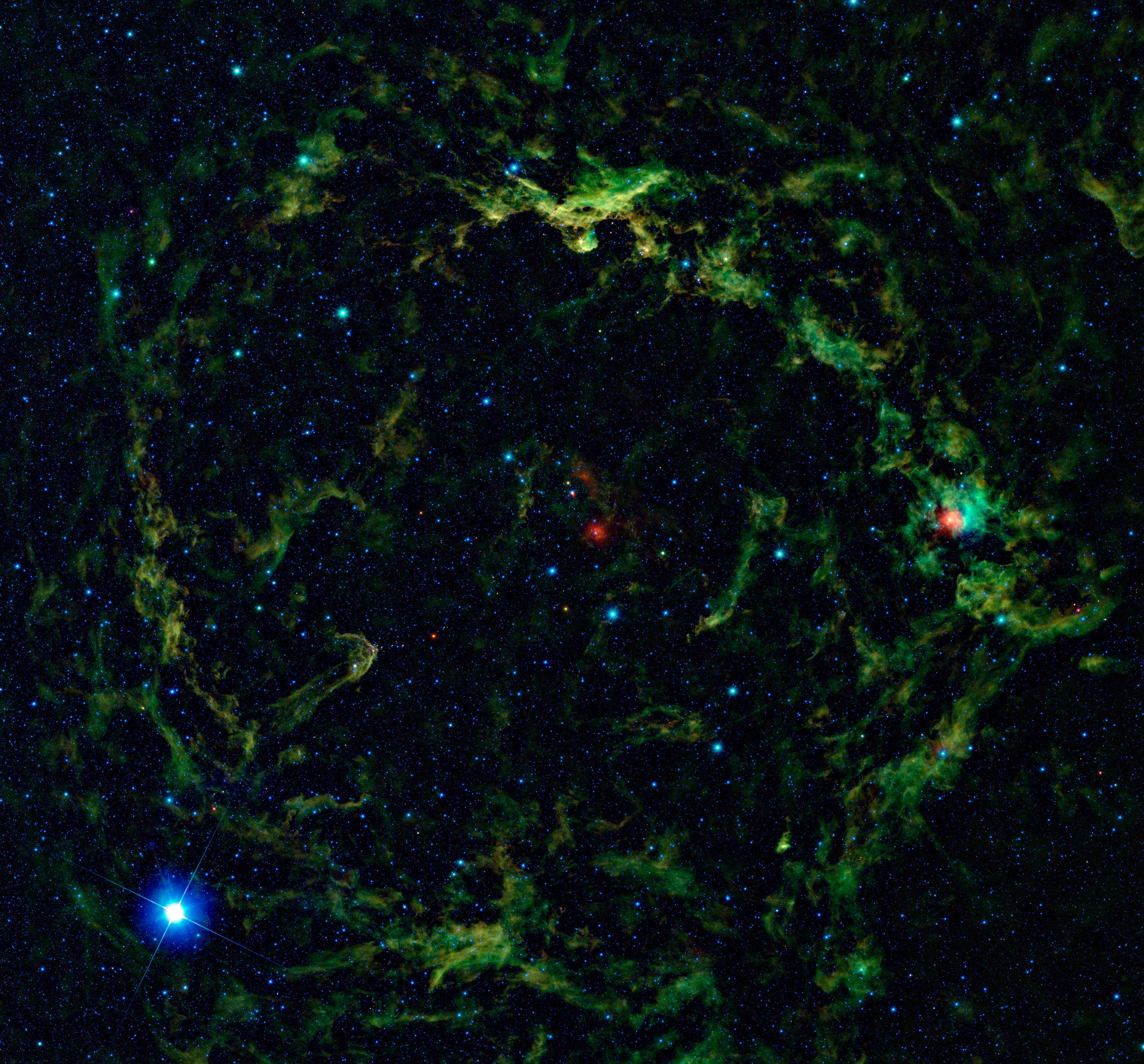
WISE infrared view of the ring around Meissa, which is the faint "white" star north of the small bright red nebula. (NASA/JPL-Caltech/UCLA)

Meissa is surrounded by a ring of nebulosity about 12 degrees across. It is thought to be the remains of a supernova explosion, now ionized by the ultraviolet radiation from Meissa itself and some of the surrounding hot stars.

== Cluster ==
This star is the dominant member of a 5-million-year-old star-forming region known as the λ Orionis cluster, or Collinder 69. The intense ultraviolet energy being radiated by this star is creating the Sh2-264 H II region in the neighboring volume of space, which in turn is surrounded by an expanding ring of cool gas that has an age of about 2–6 million years. The expansion of this gaseous ring may be explained by a former binary companion of Meissa that became a Type II supernova. Such an event would also explain the star's peculiar velocity with respect to the center of the expanding ring, as the explosion and resulting mass loss could have kicked Meissa out of the system. A potential candidate for the supernova remnant is the neutron star Geminga. However, the last is unlikely given the distance between Geminga and the cluster.

== Gallery ==
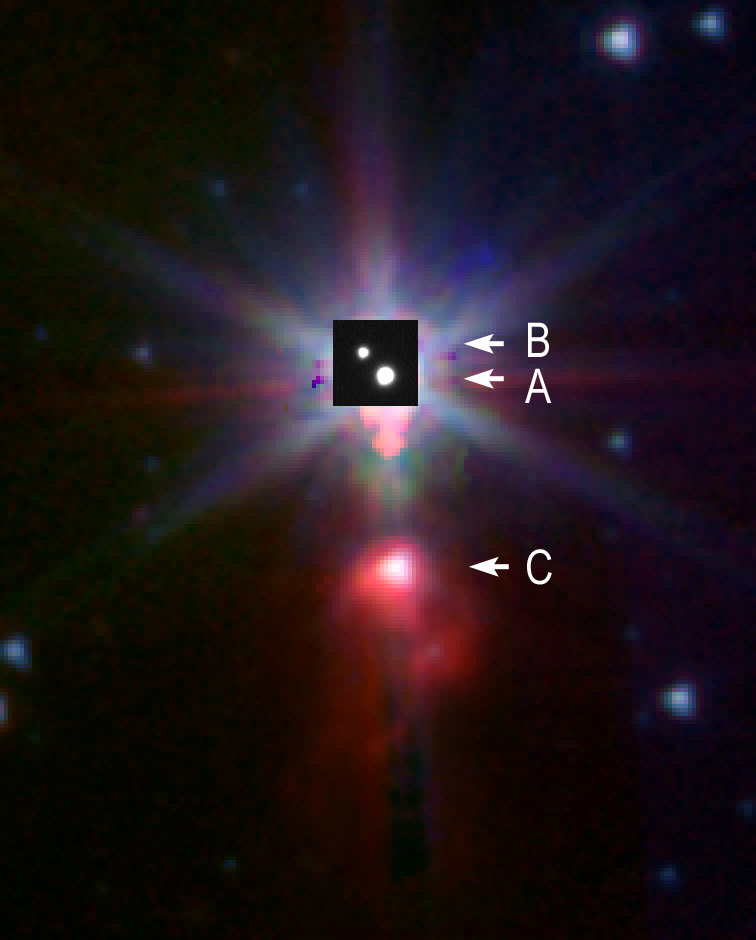
Lambda Orionis A, B and C. Background image was taken with Spitzer and insert showing the AB components is from Gemini

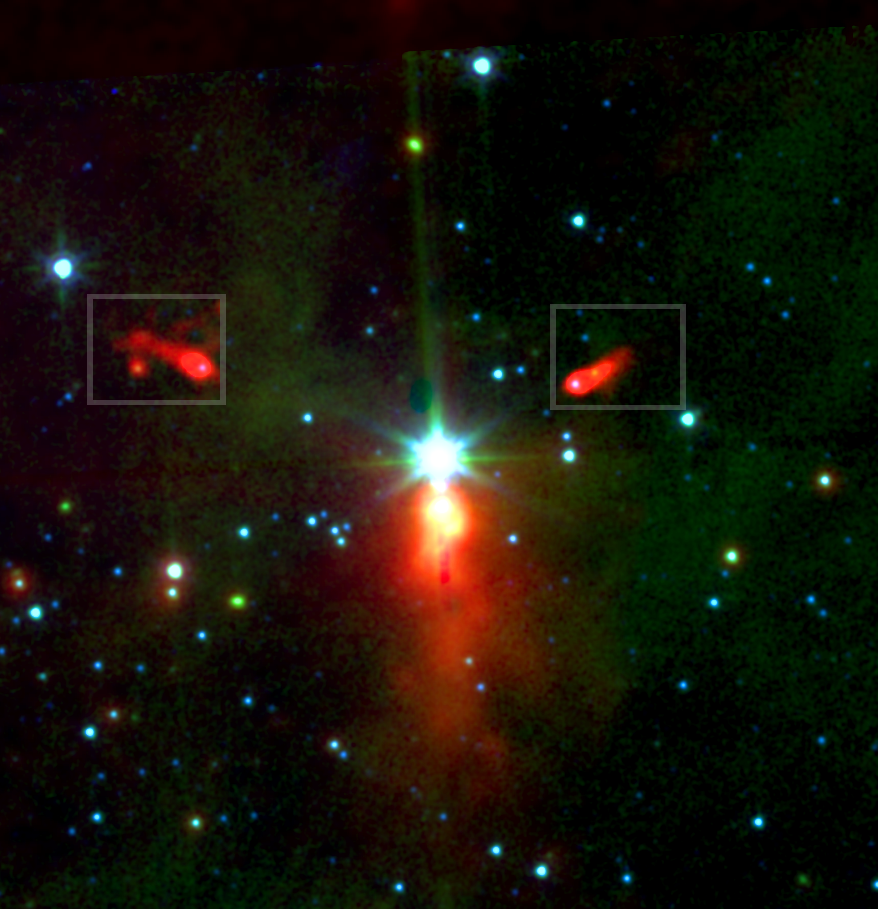
This image taken by the Spitzer Space Telescope shows two low-mass stars in the rectangles that show tails in the 24 Micron filter image. This is seen as signs that Meissa is photoevaporating the disks of these low-mass stars.
