= V1647 Orionis =

FU Orionis-type star in the constellation Orionis

- Location of V1647 Orionis (circled)

Observation data Epoch J2000 Equinox J2000
- Constellation: Orion
- Right ascension: 05^{h} 46^{m} 13.14^{s}
- Declination: −00° 06′ 04.9″
- Apparent magnitude (V): 14.7 to <24.2

Characteristics
- Evolutionary stage: Pre-main sequence
- Spectral type: M3.9
- Variable type: FUor or EXor

Astrometry
Radial velocity (R_{v})	+40.35 km/s
Proper motion (μ)	RA: −0.918 mas/yr Dec.: −1.057 mas/yr
Parallax (π)	2.422±0.1202 mas
Distance	1,350 ± 70 ly (410 ± 20 pc)

Details
Mass	0.8±0.2 M_{☉}
Radius	3.25 R_{☉}
Luminosity	9.55 (Quiet) 44 (Eruption) L_{☉}
Surface gravity (log g)	3.55 cgs
Temperature	3,800 K
Metallicity [Fe/H]	−0.48 dex
Rotation	1 day
Rotational velocity (v sin i)	120 km/s
Age	≤0.5 Myr

Other designations
- V1647 Ori, 2MASS J05461313-0006048, IRAS 05436-0007, HOPS 388, Gaia DR3 3219119189974545024, LMZ 12, TIC 176448070, OriBsmm 55, SDSS J054613.14-000604.1

Database references
SIMBAD	data

V1647 Orionis (V1647 Ori) is a young stellar object visible in the constellation Orion, located about 1470 light-years from the Solar System. It is situated in the reflection nebula M78 and is associated with McNeil's Nebula.

The object is known to have experienced intense eruptive phenomena on several occasions (the last of which occurred in 2008), the characteristics of which have led to the object being considered a middle ground between two classes of pre-main-sequence star, FU Orionis (FUor) and EX Lupi (EXor).

== Characteristics ==
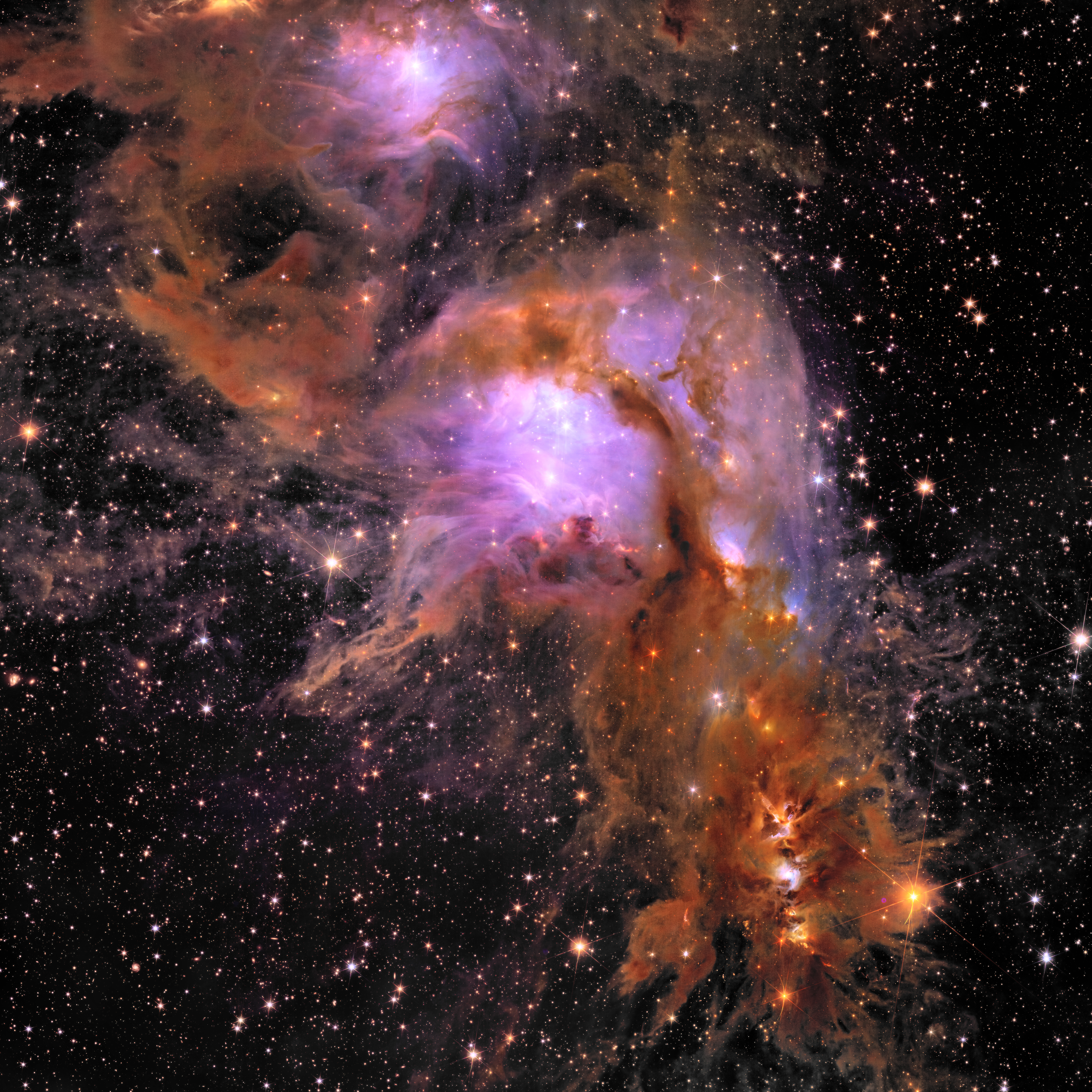
Infrared view of the Messier 78 region, with V1647 Orionis just below and right of centre

Studies have revealed that V1647 Orionis is a young stellar object, presumably a pre-main sequence star; the age of the object, based on evolutionary models and data obtained, is between 100,000 and half a million years. Like all forming stars, V1647 Orionis has a disk of gas and silicate dust in its orbit, which mediates the accretion of the star, surrounded by a gas envelope that replenishes the disk with material. The accretion proceeds at a rate averaging between ~10^{−6} and 3×10^{−7} solar masses (M_{☉}) per year. It is also a source of infrared radiation, cataloged as IRAS 05436-0007. Observations in 2018 with the ALMA radio interferometer allowed astronomers to estimate the total mass of the circumstellar disk to be about 0.1 M_{☉}, consisting largely of gas and about 1 percent of dust (~430 M_{⊕}), while its distance to the protostar is about 40 AU.

Spectroscopic and infrared analyses have made it possible to measure some of the object's physical parameters to a certain approximation. The object seems to have accumulated so far an amount of matter of about 0.8±0.2 M_{☉}, but it possesses a rather large radius, about three times that of the Sun; this results in a density that is still insufficient for the fusion reactions of hydrogen into helium to begin. The large radiating surface area causes the object to have a higher luminosity than the sun's, averaging about nine times higher. The object's spectrum also shows carbon monoxide (CO) absorption lines, typical of young protostars, with evidence of metals such as sodium and calcium. The CO emission probably originates from the gases in the innermost portion of the disk, heated to 2,500 K, and is perceptible due to a dust clearance area, that is, an area where the dust is more rarefied and therefore does not absorb radiation.

== Eruptive phenomena ==
V1647 Orionis is characterized by great variability, manifested by strong eruptions that greatly increase its brightness. The first recorded eruption of the object occurred in 1966-1967, identified by Gianluca Masi on archival images by Evered Kreimer, and was studied by analysis of photographic plates obtained from the Asiago and Harvard observatories; the precise duration of the event is not known but would be between 5 and 20 months.

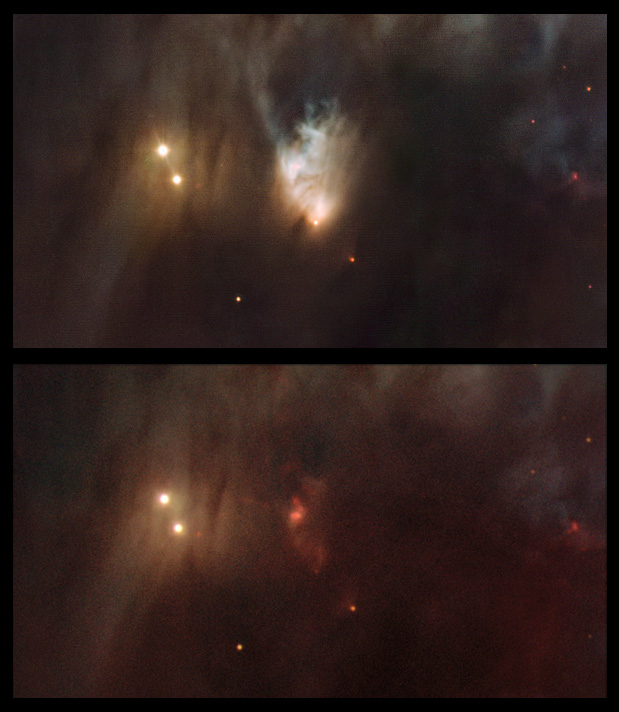
Images of the V1647 Ori region in 2004 (below) and 2006 (above); note the increase in brightness of the star between 2004 and 2006 and the simultaneous change in brightness of the McNeil's Nebula associated with the object's eruptions.

Towards the end of 2003, the object manifested a sudden increase in its luminosity, a sign that a second, intense eruption had occurred; the event was studied for two years, corresponding to the period in which it maintained an above-normal luminosity; in October 2005 its luminosity began to decrease, until, in February 2006, it returned to its pre-burst levels. During the eruption, the object reached an effective luminosity of 44 L_{☉}. A new burst was recorded in mid-2008, and had very similar characteristics to those of the eruption that began four years earlier.

The eruption of V1647 Orionis is most likely associated with a sudden mass discharge toward the photosphere of the young star from the hot circumstellar disk. The sudden increase in brightness recorded would be due to a significant increase in the accretion rate (with peaks of 5×10^{−6} M_{☉}/year), probably caused by an instability event in the disk; This increase results in the emission of an energetic wind that thins the surrounding dust, making the object visible, which is normally occulted by the dust that fuels its growth. These eruptions are believed to occur at characteristic intervals, occurring whenever a significant portion of what will be the final mass of the star has been accreted.

These dynamics are characteristic of both FU Orionis objects and EX Lupi stars; for these reasons, the classification of V1647 Ori into one or the other class is a matter of debate. While FUor is characterized by drastic increases in luminosity (greater than 5 magnitudes in the visible) and last even for several decades, EXor explosions appear fainter and last for less time, a few years at most; they also seem to recur over time.

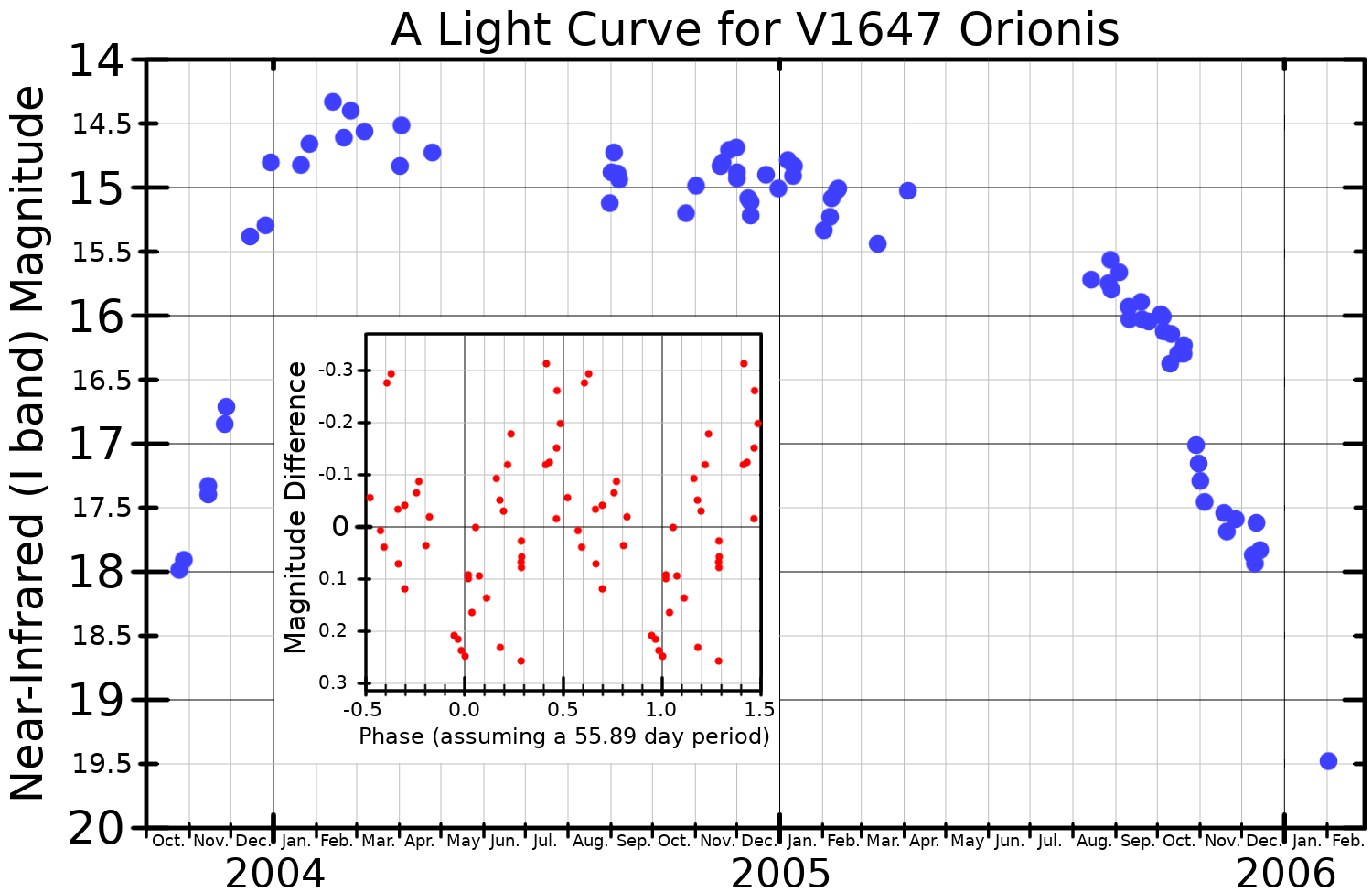
A light curve for V1647 Orionis. The main plot shows the change in near-infrared brightness during the 2004 - 2005 outburst. The inset plot shows the much weaker periodic variability. Adapted from Acosta-Pulido et al. (2007)

The explosions of V1647 Orionis are as short-lived and recurrent as the EXor, while the increase in luminosity reaches values comparable to those of the FUor, as well as the spectral energy distribution (SED) of the object itself traces that of the FUor; the optical absorption spectrum is also distinguishable from that of both the FUor and EXor. In light also of the accretion rate values, which are intermediate between these two types of pre-main sequence stars, it has been suggested that V1647 Ori constitutes a middle ground between these two stellar classes. The SED itself, coupled with the frequency of eruptive phenomena, also shows that V1647 Orionis is a class I object, which is in the transition phase from an opaque to an optically transparent disk.

During the eruptive period, NASA's Chandra Space Telescope detected intense X-ray emission from the young stellar object, reflecting the degree of reorganization that the object's and disk's magnetic field strength lines undergo before and during accretion rate increases.

From 2008 to 2018, the brightness of the object gradually decreased as it did between 2006 and 2008, reaching a minimum in early 2018 of magnitude 20 in the R-band.

== Associated nebulosity ==
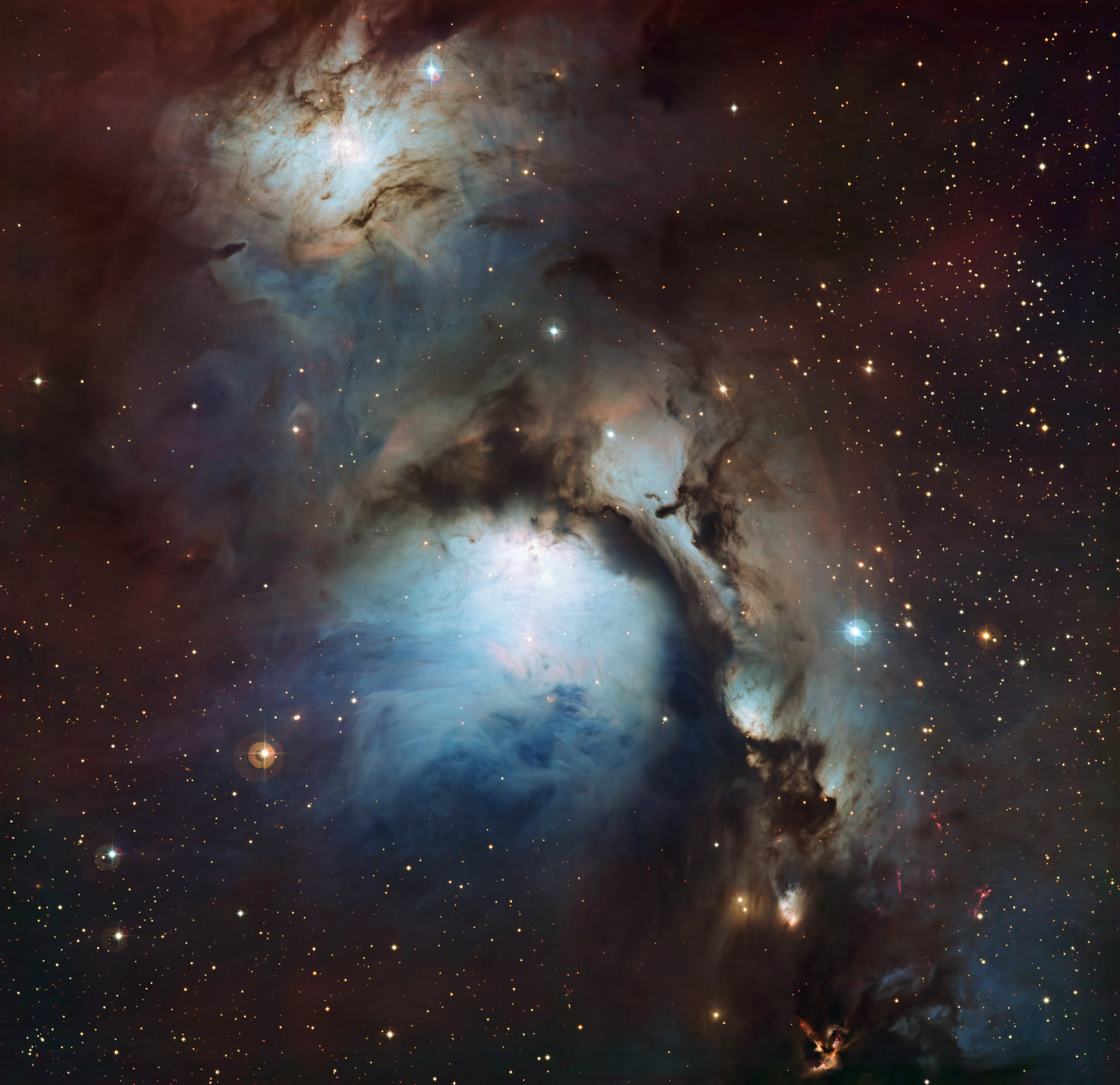
Image of M78; looking closely at the lower right, at the end of the dark gas cordon dividing the bright portion of the nebula, the McNeil Nebula can be discerned. ESO

The object is located on the northwestern edge of M78 (also known as NGC 2068), a reflection nebula well known because of its brilliance; it emits a bluish color characteristic for this kind of object, as the light source is a blue-colored star. The eruption of the star that began in 2004 illuminated some of the gas in the cloud, which was named McNeil's Cloud after its discoverer. The star also appears to be associated with the Herbig-Haro object HH 23, for which it would be the probable source.

In addition to V1647 Ori, 44 other young stars with strong Hα emission, several protostars plus a candidate class 0 protostar, cataloged as LBS 17-H, have been identified in the cloud.

Just southwest of M78, three other interconnected Herbig-Haro objects are observed, cataloged as HH 24, HH 25, and HH 26; this section of the cloud has a complex morphology due to the intense star formation phenomena taking place here. As a consequence of this, the region is rich in young stellar objects and intense sources of infrared radiation.

== Galactic environment ==
V1647 Orionis along with its associated nebulosities is located within the Orion B region (LDN 1630); with a distance of about 410 parsecs (1340 light-years), it also comes physically very close to the Orion A star-forming region, of which the Orion Nebula is also a part, and includes the fainter nebulae NGC 2024 (also known as the Flame Nebula), NGC 2023, NGC 2071 and the aforementioned M78. The first two are located in the southwestern sector of the region and show high activity of star formation phenomena

All are located within the Orion Molecular Nebula Complex, a vast complex of giant molecular clouds that lies between 1,500 and 1,600 light-years from Earth, hundreds of light-years wide. It is also one of the most active star-forming regions that can be observed in the night sky, as well as one of the richest in protoplanetary disks and very young stars. The complex is most revealing in images taken at the infrared wavelength, where the most hidden star formation processes are detected. The complex counts dark nebula, emission nebula, and H II regions among its components.

== See also ==
- Star formation
- T Tauri star
- V1057 Cygni
- FU Orionis
