= Scott Jay Kenyon =

American astrophysicist

- Born: Scott J. Kenyon
- Education: Arizona State University (1978); University of Illinois Urbana-Champaign (1983)
- Scientific career
- Fields: Astrophysics: star formation and planetary formation
- Workplaces: Smithsonian Astrophysical Observatory
- Doctoral advisor: Ronald F. Webbink

Scott Jay Kenyon (born 1956) is an American astrophysicist. His work has included advances in symbiotic and other types of interacting binary stars, the formation and evolution of stars, and the formation of planetary systems.

== Career ==
Kenyon received a B.S. in physics from Arizona State University in 1978 and a Ph.D. in astronomy from the University of Illinois Urbana-Champaign in 1983. His doctoral dissertation is titled The Physical Structure of the Symbiotic Stars and was expanded into a book, The Symbiotic Stars. After postdoctoral work at the Center for Astrophysics | Harvard & Smithsonian, including a CfA Fellowship, he joined the scientific staff at the Smithsonian Astrophysical Observatory.

Kenyon is a Fellow of the AAAS, a Fellow of the American Physical Society, and is included in the Web of Knowledge index of highly cited researchers.

== Scientific work ==
Kenyon has worked extensively on symbiotic binary stars. His book The Symbiotic Stars was the first to summarize observations and theories for these interacting binaries. The book reviews the general state of knowledge in this field c. 1984 and contains case histories of well-studied binaries and complete references to all papers published on symbiotic stars before c. 1984. With more than 350 citations, the book is a standard in the field.

Kenyon and Lee Hartmann first worked out detailed accretion disk models for pre–main sequence stars and applied these models to optical and infrared spectra of FU Orionis objects. Aside from explaining many details in the spectra of FUors, observations of the size of the disk in FU Orionis match model predictions. Observations of long-term variability in FUors also generally match model predictions. Kenyon and Hartmann used photometric observations and disk models to show that the disks of FUors are surrounded by infalling envelopes with a bipolar cavity. The bipolar cavity is a result of a wind from the disk, which interacts with the surrounding material to produce a bipolar outflow and (perhaps) a Herbig–Haro object,.

Kenyon and Hartmann later developed the first flared accretion disk model to explain the large infrared luminosities of T Tauri stars. In this model, each concentric annulus of the disk is in hydrostatic equilibrium. The surface of the disk then flares upward like the surface of a shallow bowl. A flared disk intercepts and re-radiates more light from the central star than a flat disk, producing a larger predicted infrared luminosity which agrees with observations of T Tauri stars. Theoretical images of edge-on flared disks look identical to actual images, taken with the Hubble Space Telescope, illustrating direct evidence for flared disks.

In 1990, Kenyon, Hartmann, Karen Strom & Steve Strom identified the luminosity problem: protostars in the Taurus-Auriga star-forming region are approximately 10 times less luminous than predicted by star formation theory. In this theory, protostars form by gravitational collapse of a cloud of gas and dust. Over their lifetimes, protostars radiate a total energy comparable to their binding energy. With apparent lifetimes of about 100,000 yr, they have expected luminosities of 10-20 larger than the solar luminosity. Recent observations of larger numbers of protostars with the Spitzer Space Telescope confirm that protostars have typical luminosities closer to the solar luminosity. Kenyon and colleagues identified several possible solutions to this luminosity problem. Adopting larger ages allows protostars to radiate the same amount of energy over a longer time, reducing their average luminosity. If protostars spend a small fraction of their lifetimes at much higher luminosity, as in the FU Orionis stars, then their average luminosity can be much larger than their typical luminosity. McKee & Offner note that ejecting material in a bipolar outflow reduces the expected luminosity of protostars but does not resolve the luminosity problem. Data from Spitzer resolve the luminosity problem by deriving better estimates for the time spent in a high luminosity state and larger ages of 300,000 yr for protostars. This resolution leads to an improved understanding of the early life histories of stars.

Kenyon has developed numerical models for planet formation and applied these calculations to the formation of debris disks and Kuiper belt objects. Kenyon and Ben Bromley have suggested that the dwarf planet Sedna in the outer Solar System might be an exosolar object captured during a close encounter with another planetary system when the Sun was only a few million years old. This capture mechanism might also explain other unusual [dwarf planets] such as (2004) XR 190

== Publications ==
Here is a cross-section of Kenyon's publications with more than 100 citations.

- Kenyon, S. J.; Webbink, R. F. (1984). "The Nature of Symbiotic Stars". Astrophysical Journal. 279: 252. Bibcode:1984ApJ...279..252K. doi:10.1086/161888.
- Kenyon, S. J.; Hartmann, L. (1987). "Spectral energy distributions of T Tauri stars - Disk flaring and limits on accretion". Astrophysical Journal. 323: 714. Bibcode:1987ApJ...323..714K. doi:10.1086/165866.
- Kenyon, S. J.; Hartmann, L.; Strom, K.M.; Strom, S.E. (1990). "An IRAS survey of the Taurus-Auriga molecular cloud". Astronomical Journal. 99: 869. Bibcode:1990AJ.....99..869K. doi:10.1086/115380.
- Kenyon, S. J.; Hartmann, L. (1995). "Pre-Main-Sequence Evolution in the Taurus-Auriga Molecular Cloud". Astrophysical Journal Supplement. 101: 117. Bibcode:1995ApJS..101..117K. doi:10.1086/192235.
- Hartmann, L.; Kenyon, S. J. (1996). "The FU Orionis Phenomenon". Annual Review of Astronomy and Astrophysics. 34: 207. Bibcode:1996ARA&A..34..207H. doi:10.1146/annurev.astro.34.1.207.
- Kenyon, S. J.; Luu, J. X. (1998). "Accretion in the Early Kuiper Belt II. Fragmentation". Astronomical Journal. 118 (2): 1101. arXiv:astro-ph/9904115. Bibcode:1999AJ....118.1101K. doi:10.1086/300969. S2CID 15956172.
- Kenyon, S. J.; Bromley, B.C. (2004). "Collisional Cascades in Planetesimal Disks II. Embedded Planets". Astronomical Journal. 127 (1): 513. arXiv:astro-ph/0309540. Bibcode:2004AJ....127..513K. doi:10.1086/379854. S2CID 14759834.
- Brown, Warren R.; Geller, M. J.; Kenyon, S. J.; Kurtz, M. J. (2005). "Discovery of an Unbound Hypervelocity Star in the Milky Way Halo". Astrophysical Journal Letters. 622 (1): L33. arXiv:astro-ph/0501177. Bibcode:2005ApJ...622L..33B. doi:10.1086/429378. S2CID 14322324.
- Kennedy, G.M.; Kenyon, S. J. (2008). "Planet Formation around Stars of Various Masses: The Snow Line and the Frequency of Giant Planets". Astrophysical Journal. 673 (1): 502. arXiv:0710.1065. Bibcode:2008ApJ...673..502K. doi:10.1086/524130. S2CID 2910737.
