= CX330 =

Loneliest star in the Milky Way

- Artistic Representation of CX330 Star system

Observation data Epoch J2000.0 Equinox ICRS
- Constellation: Ophiuchus
- Right ascension: 17^{h} 36^{m} 43.99^{s}
- Declination: −28° 21′ 22.4″

Characteristics
- Evolutionary stage: Young stellar object
- Spectral type: ?
- Variable type: FU Ori

Astrometry
| Distance | 25,000 ly |

Other designations
- CXOGBS J173643.8-282122, OGLE BLG653.19 81200

Database references
| SIMBAD | data |

CX330 (also known as CXOGBS J173643.8-282122) is an extremely isolated young stellar object (YSO) located in the central bulge of the Milky Way, approximately 25,000 light-years from Earth. Identified in 2009 through its X-ray emission, it is the most isolated known young star, situated over 1,000 light-years from the nearest star-forming region (nearest star-forming region from CX330 is NGC 6383 followed by Pipe Nebula and Corona Australis Molecular Cloud). CX330 is a FU Orionis-type protostar undergoing episodic accretion outbursts, making it a unique laboratory for studying star formation in low-density environments.

== Discovery ==
CX330 was first detected in 2009 during a deep X-ray survey of the Galactic Center conducted with the Chandra X-ray Observatory. The source, cataloged as CXOGBS J173643.8-282122, displayed hard X-ray emission characteristic of magnetically active pre-main-sequence stars.

Follow-up infrared observations with the Spitzer Space Telescope (2007) and WISE (2010) revealed a dramatic brightening of over 2 magnitudes in the mid-infrared, confirming an accretion outburst. Other observations are done using the Vista Variables in the Via Lactea (VVV) and Optical Gravitational Lensing Experiment (OGLE) survey.
