= IC 434 =

Emission nebula in the constellation Orion

Emission nebula
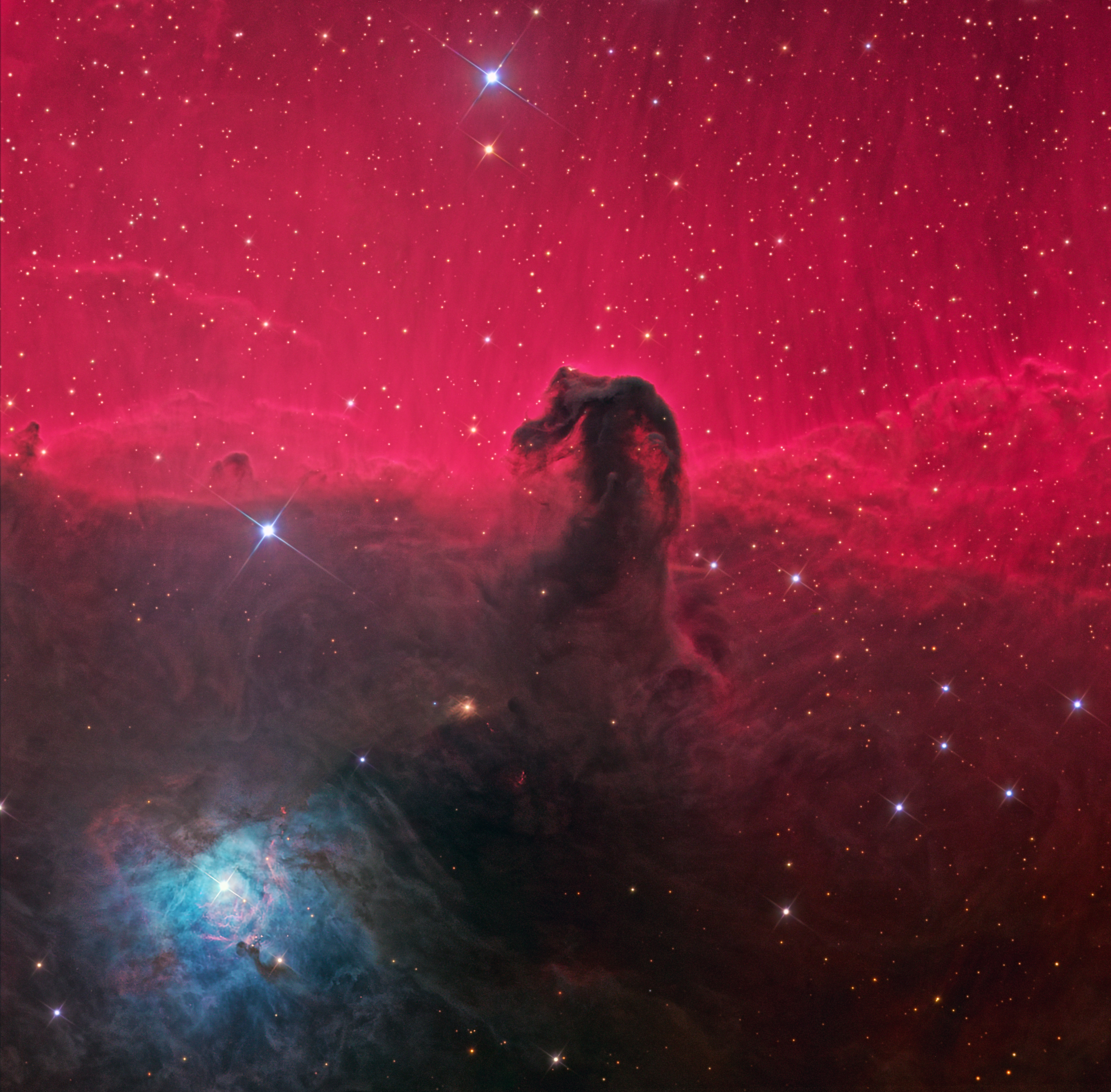
- IC 434 is found behind the Horsehead Nebula

Observation data: J2000 epoch
- Subtype: H II region
- Right ascension: 05^{h} 40.9^{m}
- Declination: −02° 27′
- Distance: 1,260 ly (385 pc) ly
- Apparent magnitude (V): 4.5
- Apparent dimensions (V): 60′ × 40′
- Constellation: Orion

IC 434 is a bright emission nebula in the equatorial constellation of Orion. It was discovered on February 1, 1786, by German-British astronomer William Herschel. The nebula is located at a distance of approximately 1,260 ly (385 pc) from the Sun and spans the interior of a neutral hydrogen shell with an angular size of 2° × 4°. At that distance, the dimensions correspond to a projected size of 42 ly × 85 ly (13 pc × 26 pc).

This is an H II region that is being ionized by ultraviolet radiation from the nearby Sigma Orionis (σ Ori) multi-star system. An additional half dozen stars provide further illumination of IC 434. This H II region is one of the youngest to form around members of the Orion OB1 association of hot stars. The region has a radius of about 13 ly (4 pc) and a mass of around ~ 100 M_{☉} The mass displaced by the advancing ionization front of IC 434 is estimated at 10^{4} M_{☉}. The nebula includes dust with an estimated mass of 2.3 M_{☉}.

IC 434 is surrounded by a shell of neutral hydrogen gas with the identifier GS206-17+13. The primary driving energy behind this expanding shell was likely supplied by the blue supergiant Epsilon Orionis. The Horsehead Nebula is a dark nebula that is silhouetted against the diffuse background of IC 434. It is protruding from the Orion B molecular cloud, which is part of the Orion molecular cloud complex.
