= Orion variable =

Type of variable stars

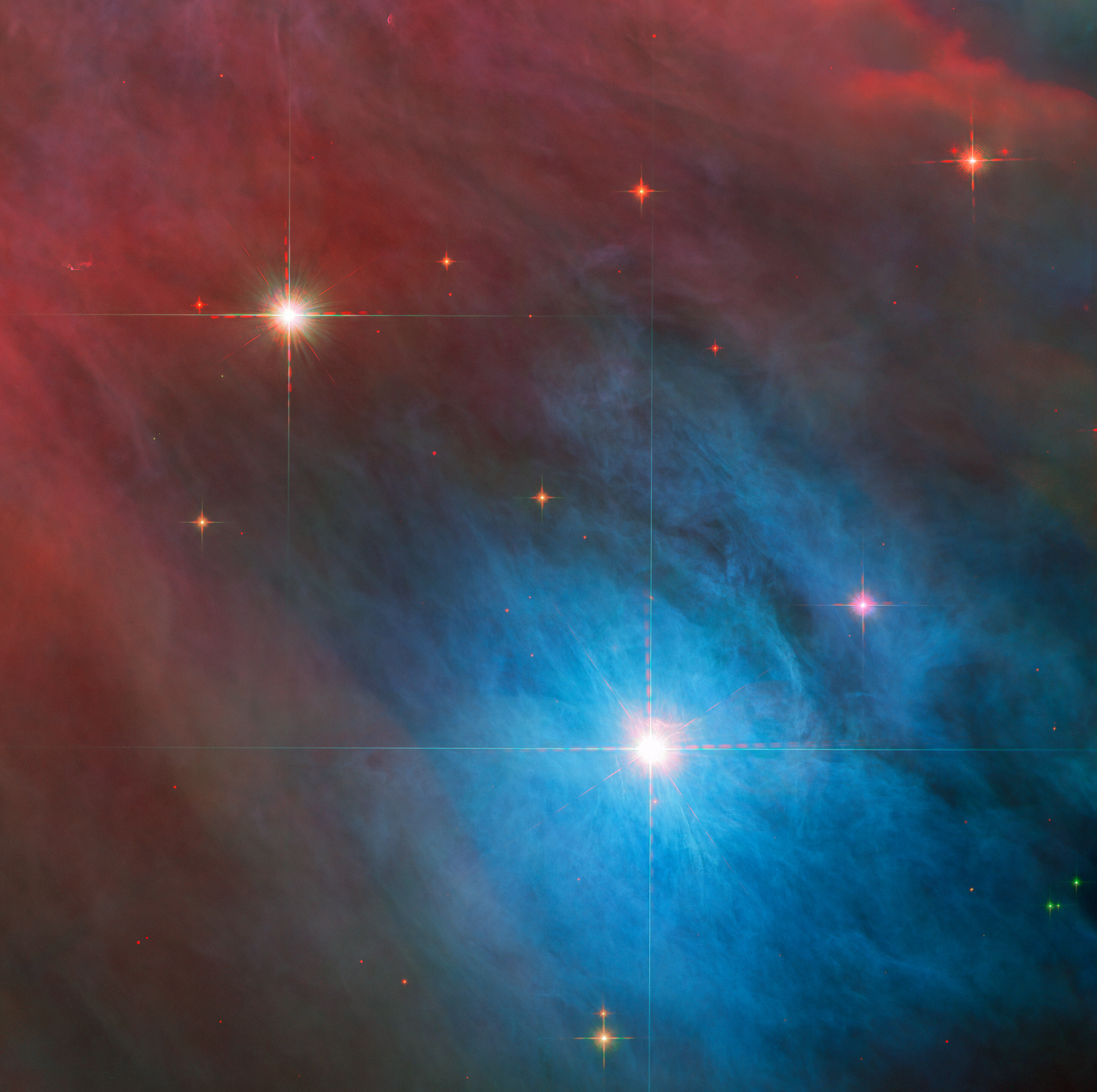
Orion variable star V372 Orionis viewed by Hubble

An Orion variable is a variable star which exhibits irregular and eruptive variations in its luminosity and is typically associated with diffuse nebulae. It is thought that these are young stars which will later become regular, non-variable stars on the zero-age main sequence. Brightness fluctuations can be as much as several magnitudes.

== T Tauri star ==
T Tauri stars are Orion variables exhibiting characteristic fluorescent violet emission lines from singly ionized iron (Fe II) in their star spectra, and also emission from lithium, a metal that usually is destroyed by the nuclear fusion in the stars.

== FU Orionis ==
FU Orionis stars or simply "Fuors", are Orion variables that rise 5–6 magnitudes, then sink up to one magnitude and stay there for many decades. The prototype is FU Orionis, and other specimens are V1057 Cygni and V1515 Cygni.

== Variability ==
Of this diverse class of stars, some Orion variables may exhibit a small amplitude (up to 1 magnitude) periodic variation, some are characterized by abrupt fadings, and some show spectral characteristics indicating mass downfall upon the star (YY Orionis stars). Many of these characteristics may occur in any one Orion variable.

The term 'Orion Variable' was a handy catch-all term but is now tending to drop out of disuse among the astronomical community, though for historical reasons the GCVS still uses it. Astronomers use more specialised terms which refer to actual physical differences among the 'zoo' of young variable stars, such as 'Classical T Tauri' or 'UX Orionis' stars.
