= Lori Allen (astronomer) =

American astronomer

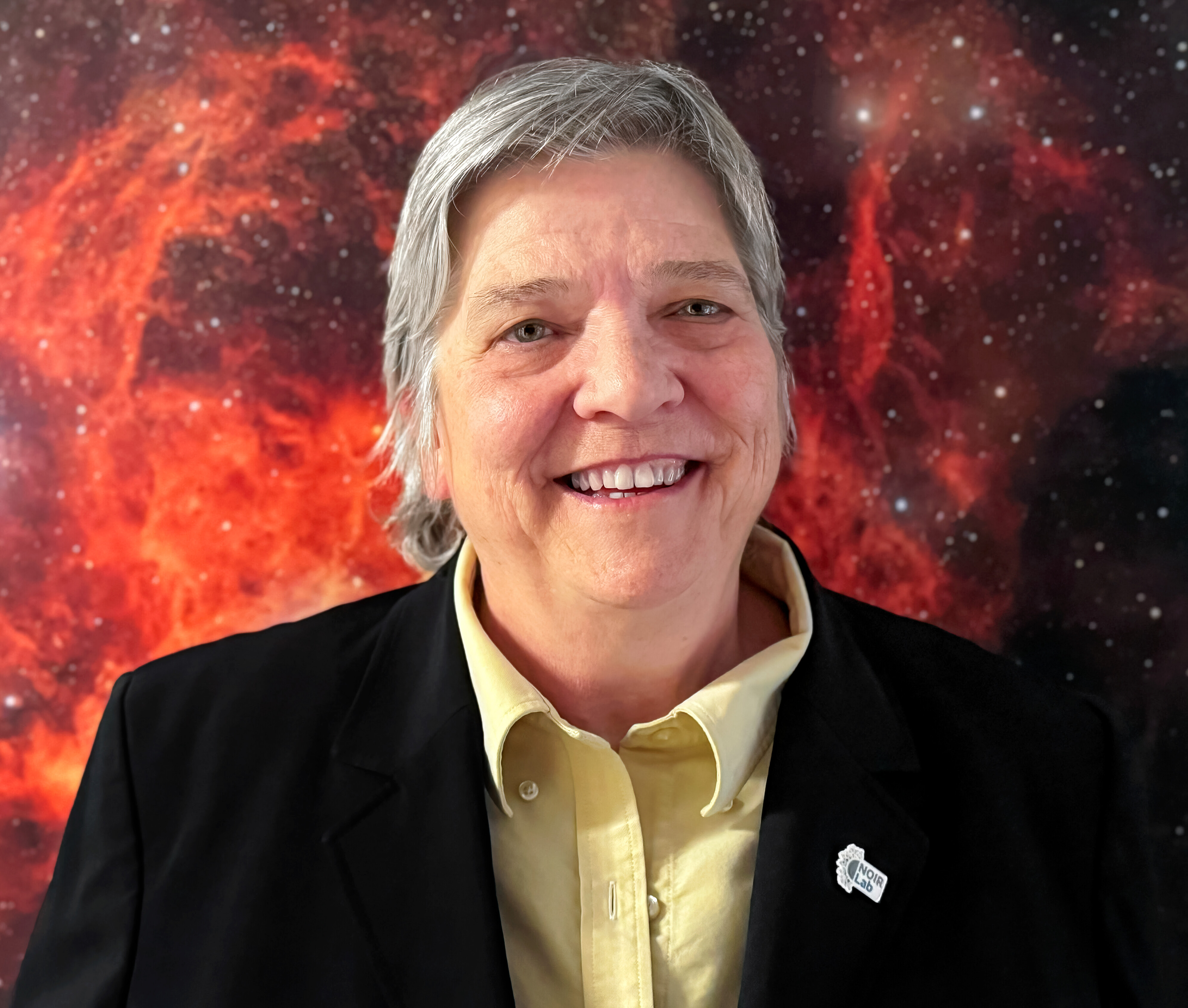
Lori Allen

Lori Elaine Allen is an American astronomer, the director of Mid-Scale Observatories at NOIRLab, a center for ground-based optical and infrared astronomy funded by the National Science Foundation that operates several astronomy facilities worldwide.

== Education and career ==
Allen has a bachelor's degree from the University of California, Santa Cruz, and a Ph.D. from the University of Massachusetts Amherst. Her 1996 doctoral dissertation, Star formation in Lynds 1641, was supervised by Karen Strom.

She worked on the Infrared Array Camera of the Spitzer Space Telescope, at the Harvard–Smithsonian Center for Astrophysics, before moving in 2009 to the National Optical Astronomy Observatory, the predecessor organization to the NOIRLab. She has been associate director of the Kitt Peak National Observatory, and acting director of the National Optical Astronomy Observatory. As director of Mid-Scale Observatories, her responsibilities include oversight of both the Kitt Peak National Observatory and the Cerro Tololo Inter-American Observatory.

== Recognition ==
Allen was named to the 2023 class of fellows of the American Association for the Advancement of Science, "for exceptional leadership in advancing ground-based optical-infrared astronomy".
