= FU Orionis star =

Type of eruptive variable star

Short narrated video about the protostar V1647 Orionis and its X-ray emission in 2004.

In stellar evolution, an FU Orionis star (also FU Orionis object, or FUor) is a pre–main-sequence star which displays an extreme change in magnitude and spectral type. One example is the star V1057 Cyg, which became six magnitudes brighter and went from spectral type dKe to F-type supergiant during 1969–1970. This variable class is named after its prototype star, FU Orionis.

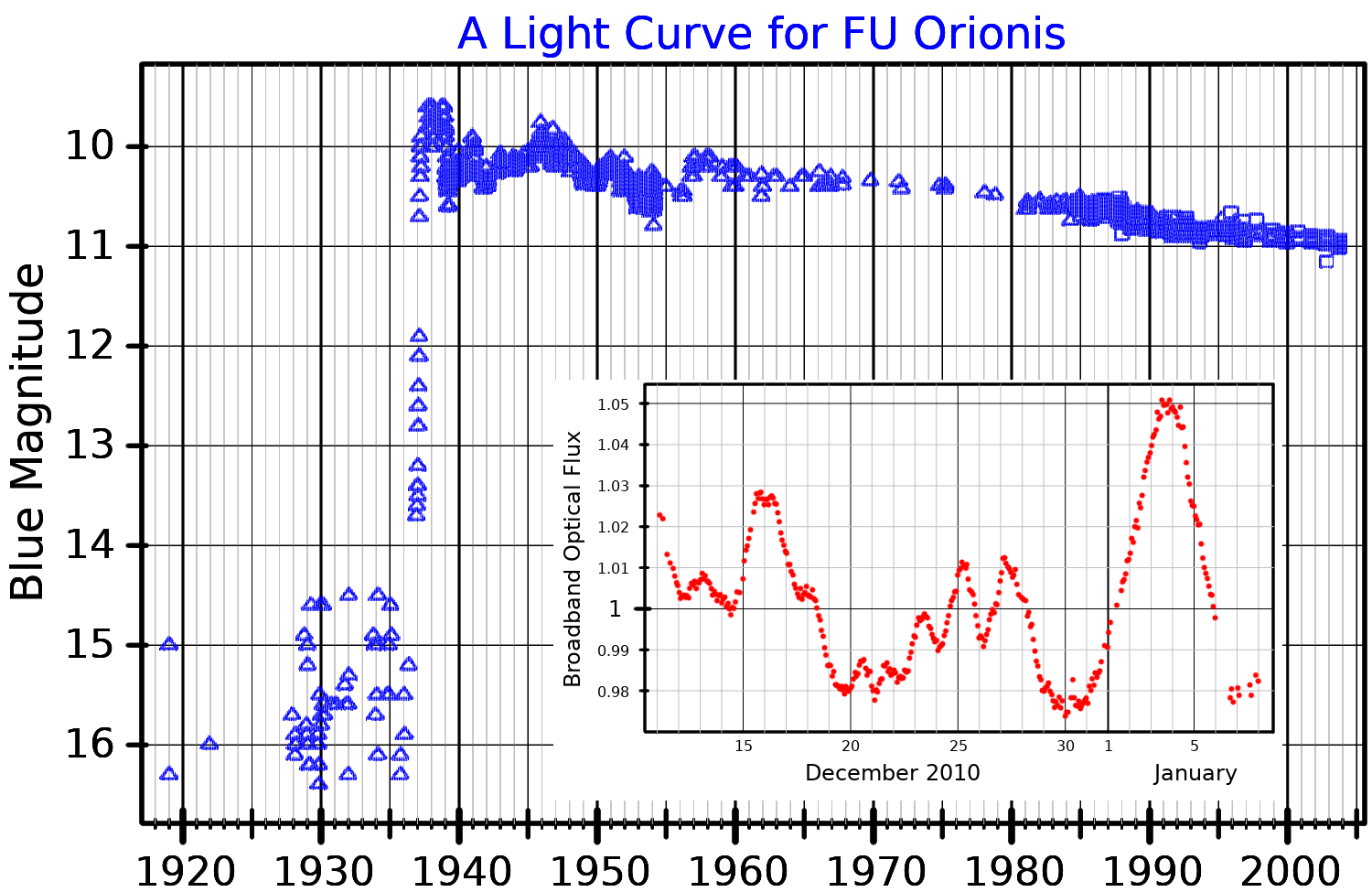
The blue band light curve for FU Orionis, adapted from Clarke et al. (2005). The inset plot, adapted from Siwak, et al. (2013), illustrates the short timescale variability.

The current model developed primarily by Lee Hartmann and Scott Jay Kenyon associates the FU Orionis flare with abrupt mass transfer from an accretion disc onto a young, low mass T Tauri star. Mass accretion rates for these objects are estimated to be around 10^{−4} solar masses per year. The rise time of these eruptions is typically on the order of 1 year, but can be much longer. The lifetime of this high-accretion, high-luminosity phase is on the order of decades. However, even with such a relatively short timespan, as of 2015 no FU Orionis object had been observed shutting off. By comparing the number of FUor outbursts to the rate of star formation in the solar neighborhood, it is estimated that the average young star undergoes approximately 10–20 FUor eruptions over its lifetime.

The spectra of FU Orionis stars are dominated by absorption features produced in the inner accretion disc. The spectrum of the inner part produce a spectrum of a F-G supergiant, while the outer parts and slightly colder parts of the disk produce a K-M type supergiant spectrum that can be observed in the near-infrared. In FU Orionis stars the disk radiation dominates, which can be used to study the inner parts of the disk.

The prototypes of this class are: FU Orionis, V1057 Cygni, V1515 Cygni, and the embedded protostar V1647 Orionis, which erupted in January 2004.

== See also ==
- Orion variable
- T Tauri star
- EX Lup variable star (also called an EXor)
