= EX Lupi =

T-Tauri star

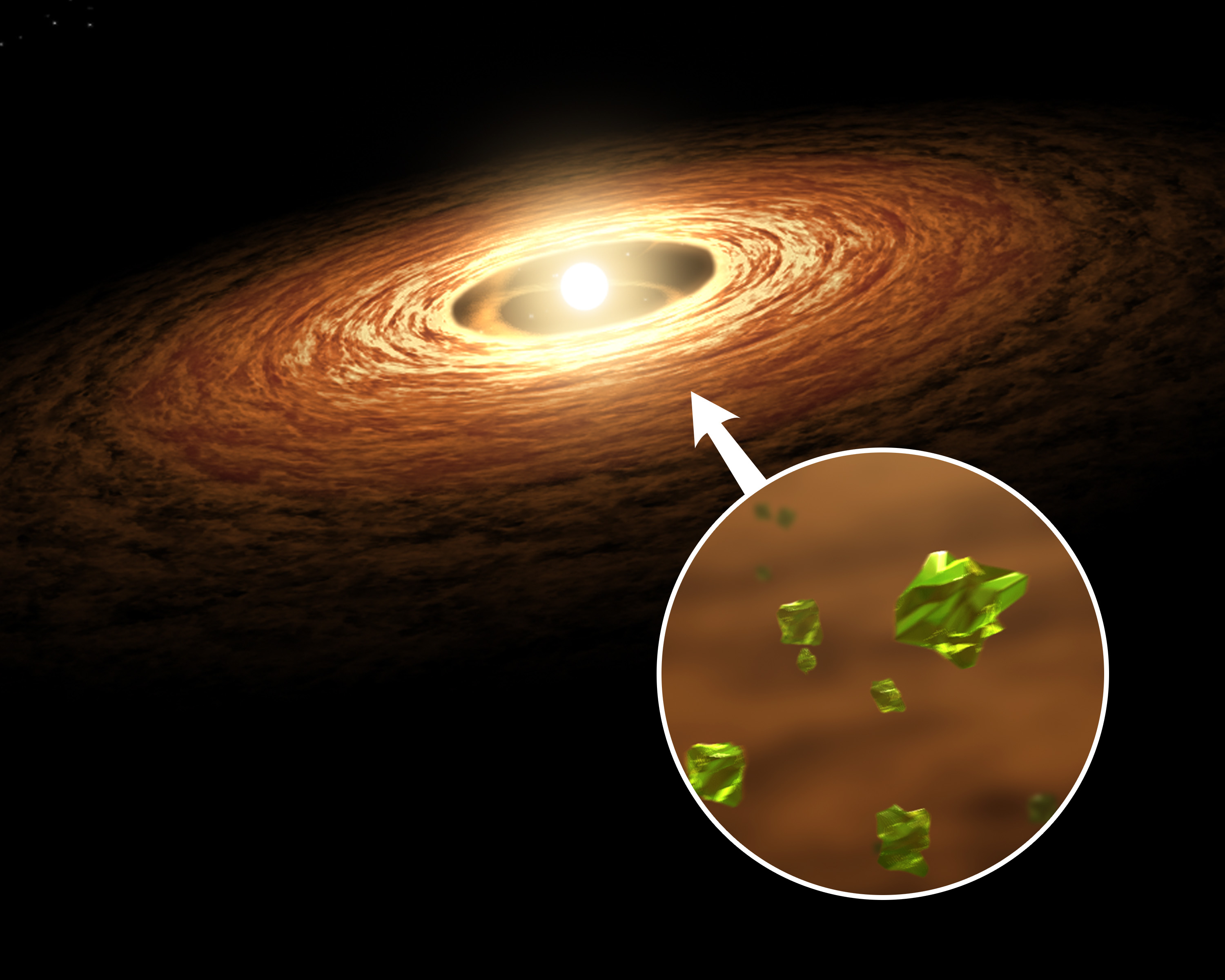
- Artist's illustration of the disk around EX Lupi, showing the formation of silicate crystals

Observation data Epoch J2000.0 Equinox J2000.0
- Constellation: Lupus
- Right ascension: 16^{h} 03^{m} 05.491^{s}
- Declination: −40° 18′ 25.43″

Characteristics
- Evolutionary stage: Pre-main-sequence
- Spectral type: M0
- Variable type: YY Ori

Astrometry
Radial velocity (R_{v})	−0.9±0.1 km/s
Proper motion (μ)	RA: −10.157 mas/yr Dec.: −22.531 mas/yr
Parallax (π)	6.4634±0.0150 mas
Distance	505 ± 1 ly (154.7 ± 0.4 pc)

Details
Mass	0.6 M_{☉}
Radius	1.6 R_{☉}
Luminosity	1.23±0.53 L_{☉}
Temperature	3,850±177 K
Rotational velocity (v sin i)	4.4±2.0 km/s

Other designations
- EX Lup, HD 325367, IRAS 15597-4010, HV 11976

Database references
SIMBAD	data

EX Lupi is a young, single T-Tauri star in the southern constellation of Lupus. An irregular variable, it is the prototype of young, low-mass eruptive stars named EXors, with EX Lupi being this object's variable star designation. At its minimal activity level, EX Lupi resembles a classical T-Tauri star of the M0 dwarf type. The low latitude of this star, at a declination of −40°, makes it difficult for northern observers to view. Based on parallax measurements, it is located at a distance of about 505 light years from the Sun. The star lies next to a gap in the Lupus cloud complex, a star forming region.

During 1944, Edith M. Janssen at Harvard Observatory noticed a stellar spectrum that displayed bright lines on a photographic plate taken April 11, 1929, but these lines were missing on a spectrum from July 13, 1928. This star was found to be only two magnitudes fainter than at maximum, so a nova was ruled out. D. B. McLaughlin then undertook a study of this object going as far back as 1893, finding further outbursts in 1901, 1914, 1925, 1929, 1934. Each time the brightness increased by about two magnitudes, followed by smaller, irregular fluctuations lasting 1–2 years before returning to a near constant minimum at magnitude 13.2. Now designated EX Lupi, George Herbig studied the spectrum of this irregular variable in 1950, finding that it is similar to other emission-line stars associated with nebulosity.

The next observed outburst was during the period 1955–1957 and was tracked by A. F. Jones. It reached a peak magnitude of 8.4, followed by a secondary brightening about 300 days later. After a period of quiescence during the 1980s, another eruptive burst was observed in March 1994. It reached a peak magnitude of 11.5 on both April 30 and May 14. The cause was now understood to be the result of a mass accretion event with the infalling matter releasing its kinetic energy on the T-Tauri star. This creates a hot emission region that dominates the light output from the star. Many of the emission lines show an inverse P Cygni profile, thereby demonstrating that it is coming from infalling material. Absorption lines in the spectrum show a redshift indicating a velocity of 300 km/s.

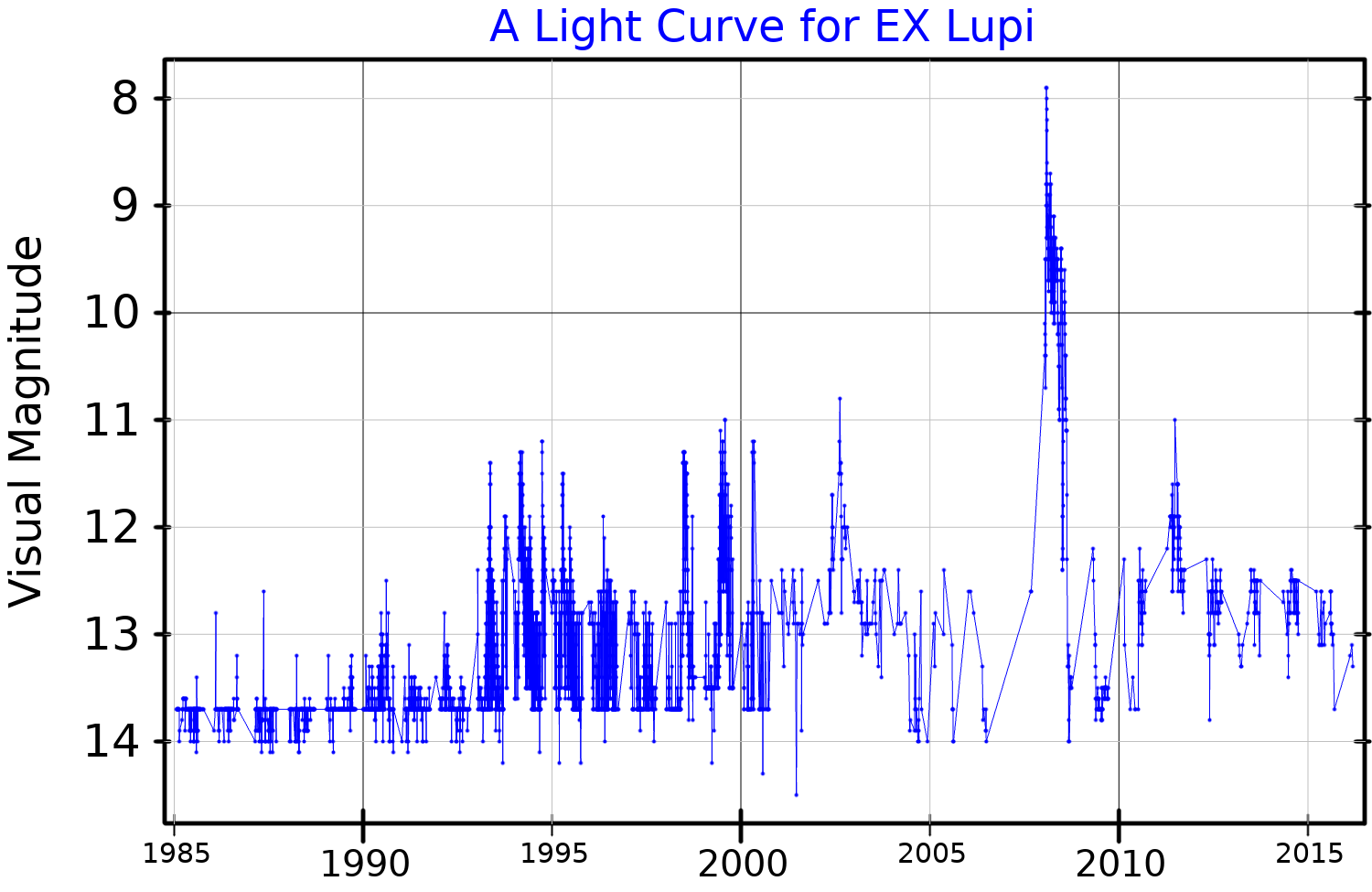
A visual band light curve for EX Lupi, plotted from AAVSO data

A major outburst of EX Lupi began in January 2008, and it reached a peak visual magnitude of 8 during February. It remained optically brighter by five magnitudes for a period of seven months. Infrared observations of the star's circumstellar disk during the outburst shows spectral features of crystalline silicates, including strong indications of forsterite. The features resembled those seen in comets and some protoplanetary disks. The temperature of the disk is mostly below 700 K, indicating a circumstellar dust-free inner hole with a radius of 0.2 AU. The disk may extend outward to at least 150 AU. At stellar quiescence, the infrared silicate feature at a wavelength of 10 μm can be explained as amorphous silicates of olivine and pyroxene. Observations with Spitzer did showed an burst of cold water vapour. This is explained with enhanced ice sublimation due to a recession of the snowline. In 2022 and 2023 the cold water vapour is still unusually strong from JWST spectra, showing that water freeze-out takes more than 10 years.

Matter from the circumstellar disk is being accreted onto the star by means of accretion columns. This column may be the cause of the 7.417 day radial velocity variations observed with this star. EX Lupi is accreting mass at a typical estimated rate of 3.6×10^{−8} M_{☉}·yr^{−1}, which can climb as high as 10^{−7} M_{☉}·yr^{−1} during peak bursts. Between outbursts, the star undergoes moderate variability of 1–2 magnitudes due to variations in the rate of accretion.

== See also ==
- FU Orionis star
