= Horsehead Nebula =

Dark nebula in the constellation Orion

Dark nebula
- diffuse
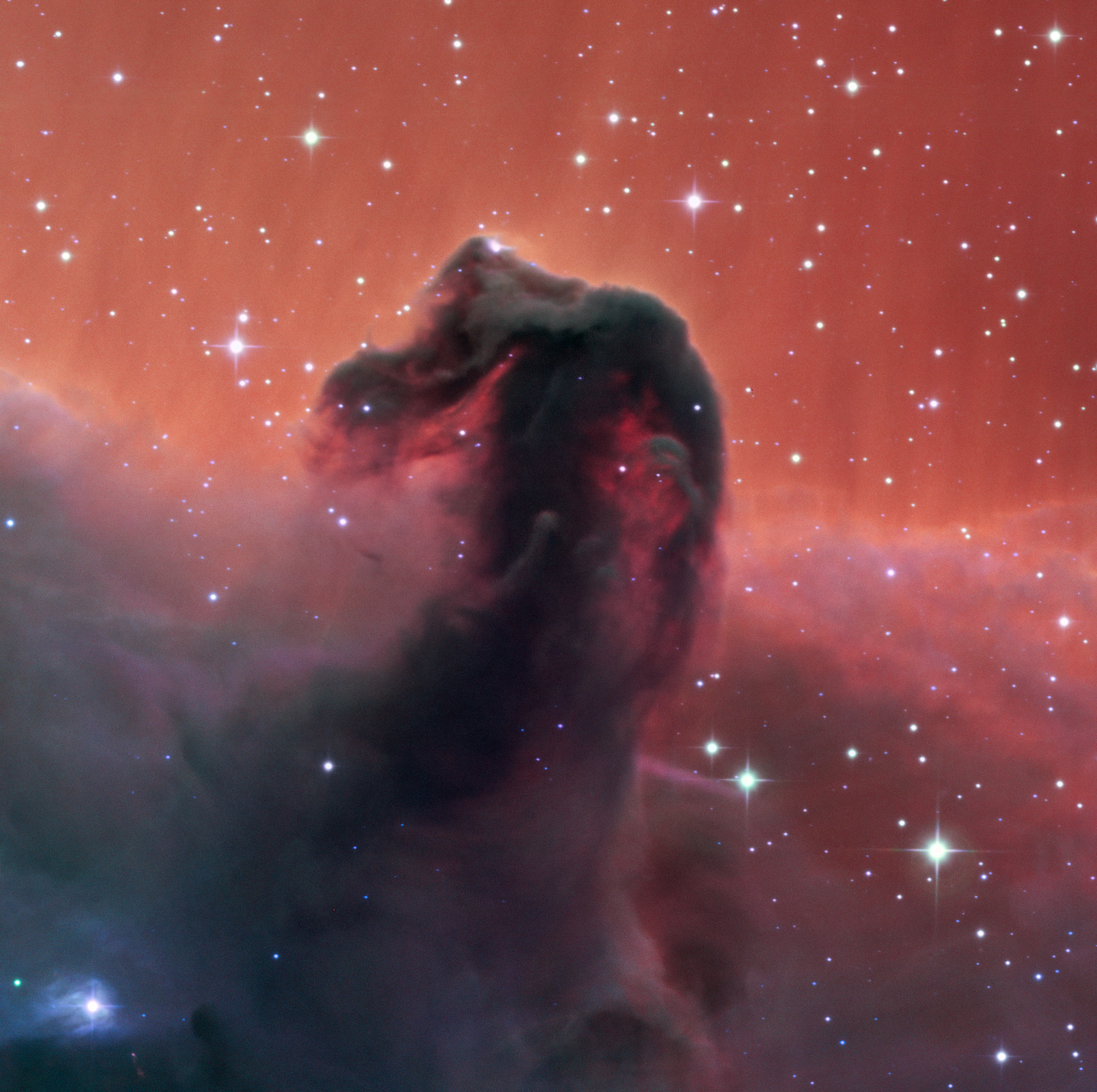
- The Horsehead Nebula

Observation data: J2000.0 epoch
- Right ascension: 05^{h} 40^{m} 59.0^{s}
- Declination: −02° 27′ 29.99"
- Distance: 1,375±54 (Note: Based on the parallax of 2MASS J05405172-0226489, a young stellar object embedded in the 'head' of the nebula.) ly (422±17 pc)
- Apparent magnitude (V): 6.8
- Apparent dimensions (V): 8 × 6 arcmins
- Constellation: Orion

Physical characteristics
- Radius: 3.5 ly
- Designations: Barnard 33, LDN 1630

The Horsehead Nebula (also known as Barnard 33 or B33) is a small dark nebula located about 1,375 light-years (422 pc) from Earth in the constellation of Orion. The nebula is located just to the south of Alnitak, the easternmost star of Orion's Belt, and is part of the much larger Orion molecular cloud complex. It appears within the southern region of the dense dust cloud known as Lynds 1630, along the edge of the much larger, active star-forming H II region called IC 434. It is one of the most identifiable nebulae because of its resemblance to a horse's head.

== History ==
The nebula was discovered by Williamina Fleming in 1888 on a photographic plate taken at the Harvard College Observatory. One of the first descriptions was made by E. E. Barnard, describing it as: "Dark mass, diam. 4′, on nebulous strip extending south from ζ Orionis", cataloguing the dark nebula as Barnard 33.

== Structure ==
It has an easily recognizable shape which resembles the head of a horse. Heavy concentrations of dust in the Horsehead Nebula region and the neighbouring Orion Nebula are localized into interstellar clouds resulting in alternating sections of nearly complete opacity and transparency. The darkness of the Horsehead is caused mostly by thick dust blocking the light of stars behind it. The lower part of the Horsehead's neck casts a shadow to the left. The visible dark nebula emerging from the gaseous complex is an active site of the formation of "low-mass" stars. Bright spots in the Horsehead Nebula's base are young stars just in the process of forming.

The dark cloud of dust and gas is a region in the Orion molecular cloud complex, where star formation is taking place. It is located in the constellation of Orion, which is prominent in the winter evening sky in the Northern Hemisphere and the summer evening sky in the Southern Hemisphere.

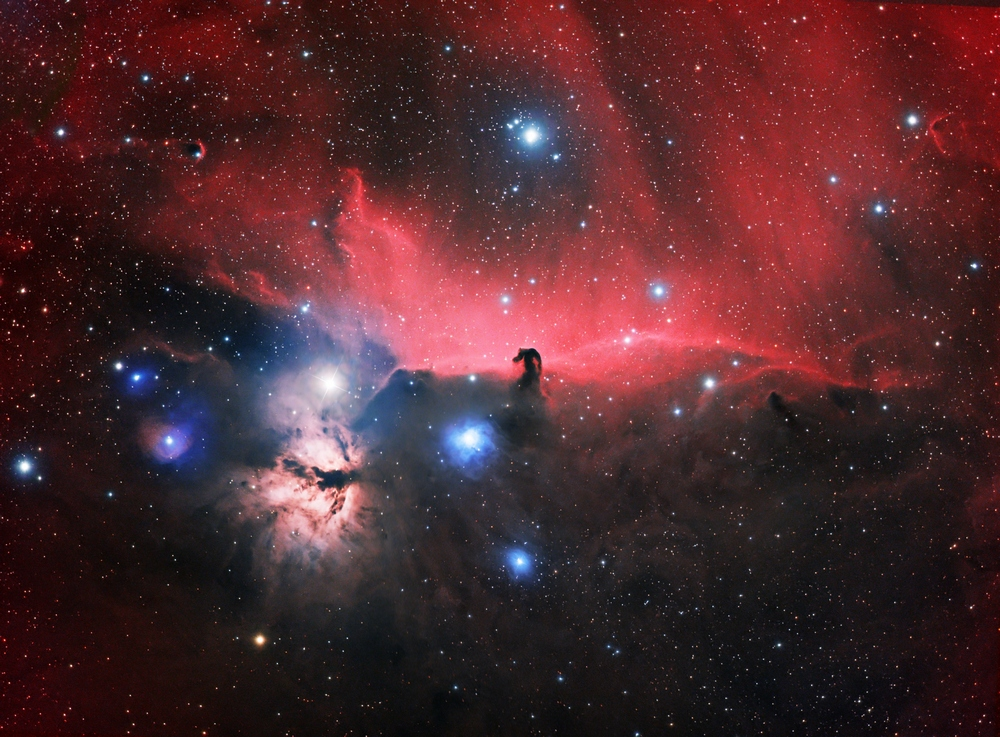
The Horsehead Nebula and its surroundings. The reflection nebula NGC 2023 in the bottom left corner.

Colour images reveal a red colour that originates from ionised hydrogen gas (Hα) predominantly behind the nebula, and caused by the nearby bright star Sigma Orionis. Magnetic fields channel the gases, leaving the nebula into streams, shown as foreground streaks against the background glow. A glowing strip of hydrogen gas marks the edge of the enormous cloud, and the densities of nearby stars are noticeably different on either side.

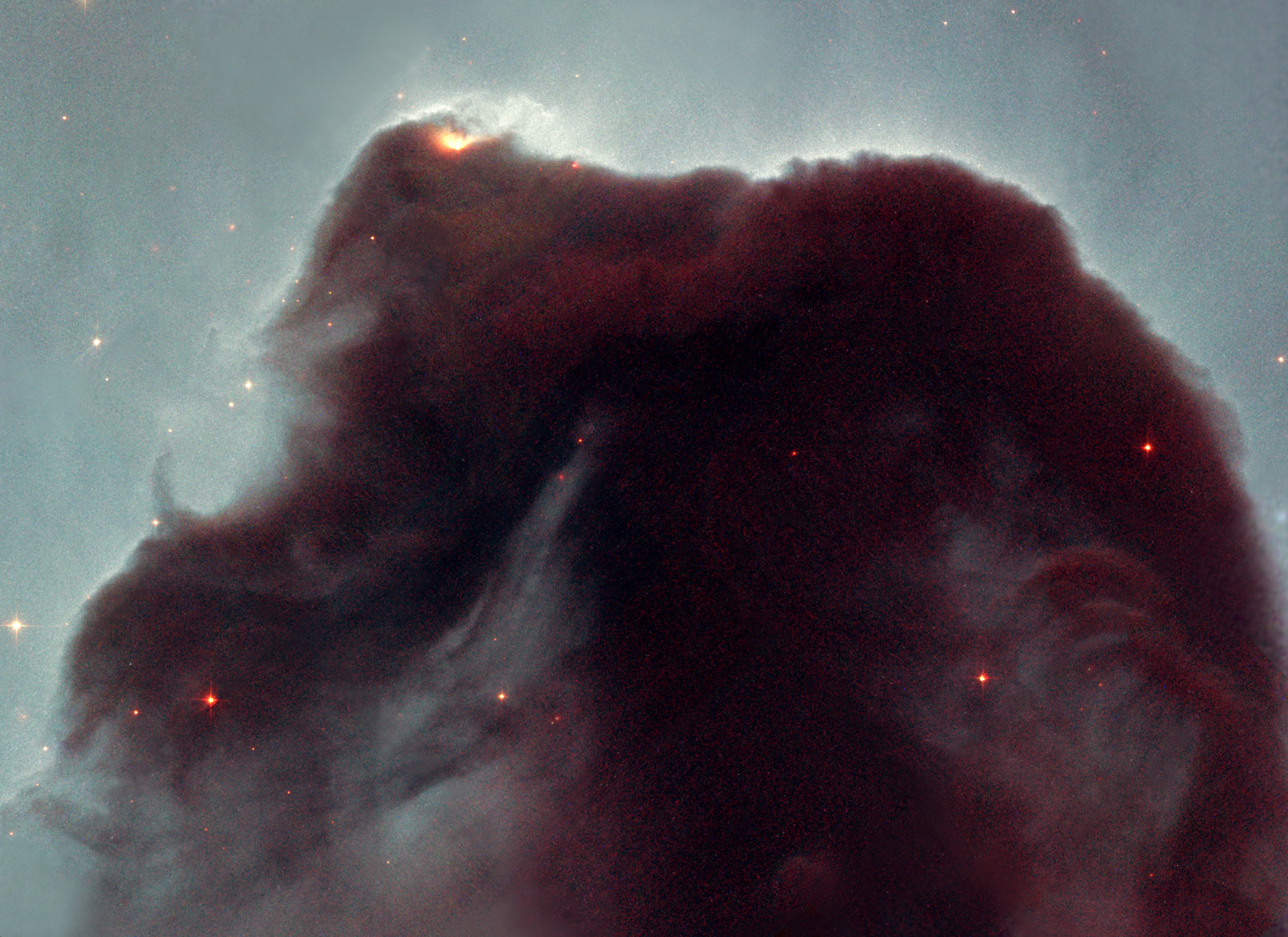
Close up view of the Horsehead Nebula, taken by the Hubble Space Telescope in 2001. The image was captured upon popular demand to celebrate the eleventh anniversary of the telescope.

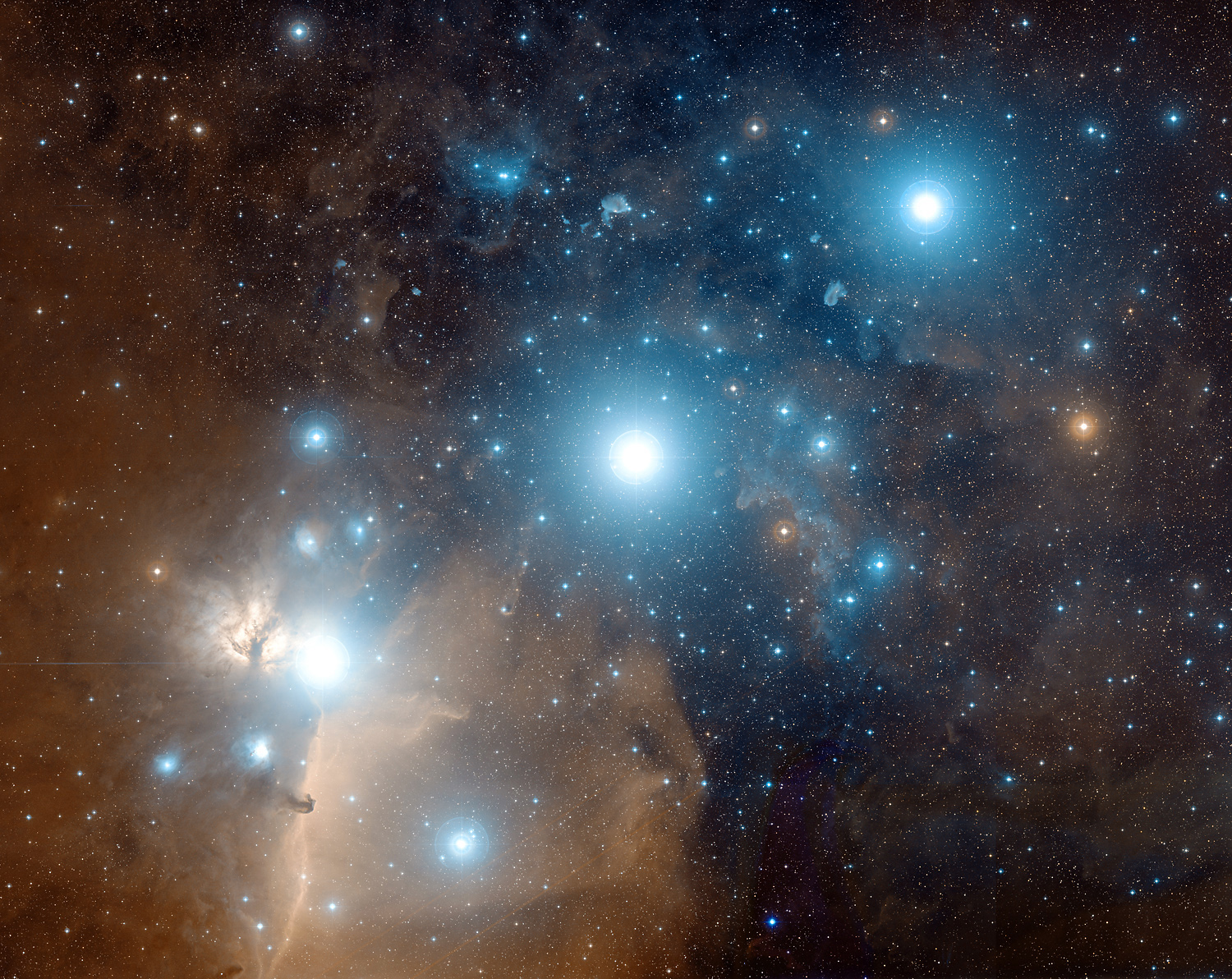
The three bright stars of Orion's Belt with the Horsehead Nebula to the lower left of the belt star Alnitak

== In popular culture ==
In Isaac Asimov's 1951 novel The Stars, Like Dust, two characters argue over where the nebula got its name. One character, who studied on earth, explains that it was so named because it looks like a horse's head. The other character, who grew up on another planet, believes it was so named after Horace Hedd, the first man to enter it.

== See also ==
- List of Hubble anniversary images
