= Karen Strom =

American astronomer and photographer

- Born: Karen Marie Lewallen; August 18, 1941; Fairfax, Oklahoma, U.S.
- Died: April 29, 2014 (aged 72)
- Education: Harvard College
- Occupations: Astronomer; Photographer
- Spouse: Stephen Strom
- Scientific career
- Workplaces: Smithsonian Astrophysical Observatory; Stony Brook University; Kitt Peak National Observatory; University of Massachusetts Amherst
- Doctoral students: Lori Allen
- Website: karenstrom.com

Karen Marie Strom (née Lewallen; August 18, 1941 – April 29, 2014) was an American astronomer known for her work on stellar evolution and T Tauri stars, and described as a "world leader in the study of star formation". She was also a fine art photographer whose work is in the collections of multiple museums, and a historian of Native American culture.

== Life ==
Strom was born in Fairfax, Oklahoma, on August 18, 1941. After graduating from Harvard College in 1964, she worked for several years at the Smithsonian Astrophysical Observatory. In 1969, she followed her husband Stephen Strom to Stony Brook University as a research associate, and in 1972 they moved again to the Kitt Peak National Observatory, in Tucson, Arizona. They moved again to the University of Massachusetts Amherst in 1983, where Strom became a research associate and later Senior Research Fellow, returning to Tucson in 1998. She died on April 29, 2014.

== Photography ==
Strom's photograph "Chapel Grid" (1981), a gelatin silver print, is in the collection of the Museum of Fine Arts, Houston. Four of her digital prints, studies of the tilework at the Alhambra from 2012 to 2013, are in the collection of the Tucson Museum of Art. Others of her works are in the collections of the Center for Creative Photography at the University of Arizona, the Fred Jones Jr. Museum of Art at the University of Oklahoma, and the Santa Barbara Museum of Art.

== Recognition ==
In 1986 the National Institute of Astrophysics, Optics and Electronics in Mexico gave Strom an honorary doctorate.

Minor planet 4604 Stekarstrom, discovered in 1987, was named after Strom and her husband.
