= NGC 2023 =

Emission nebula in the constellation Orion

Reflection nebula
- emission nebula
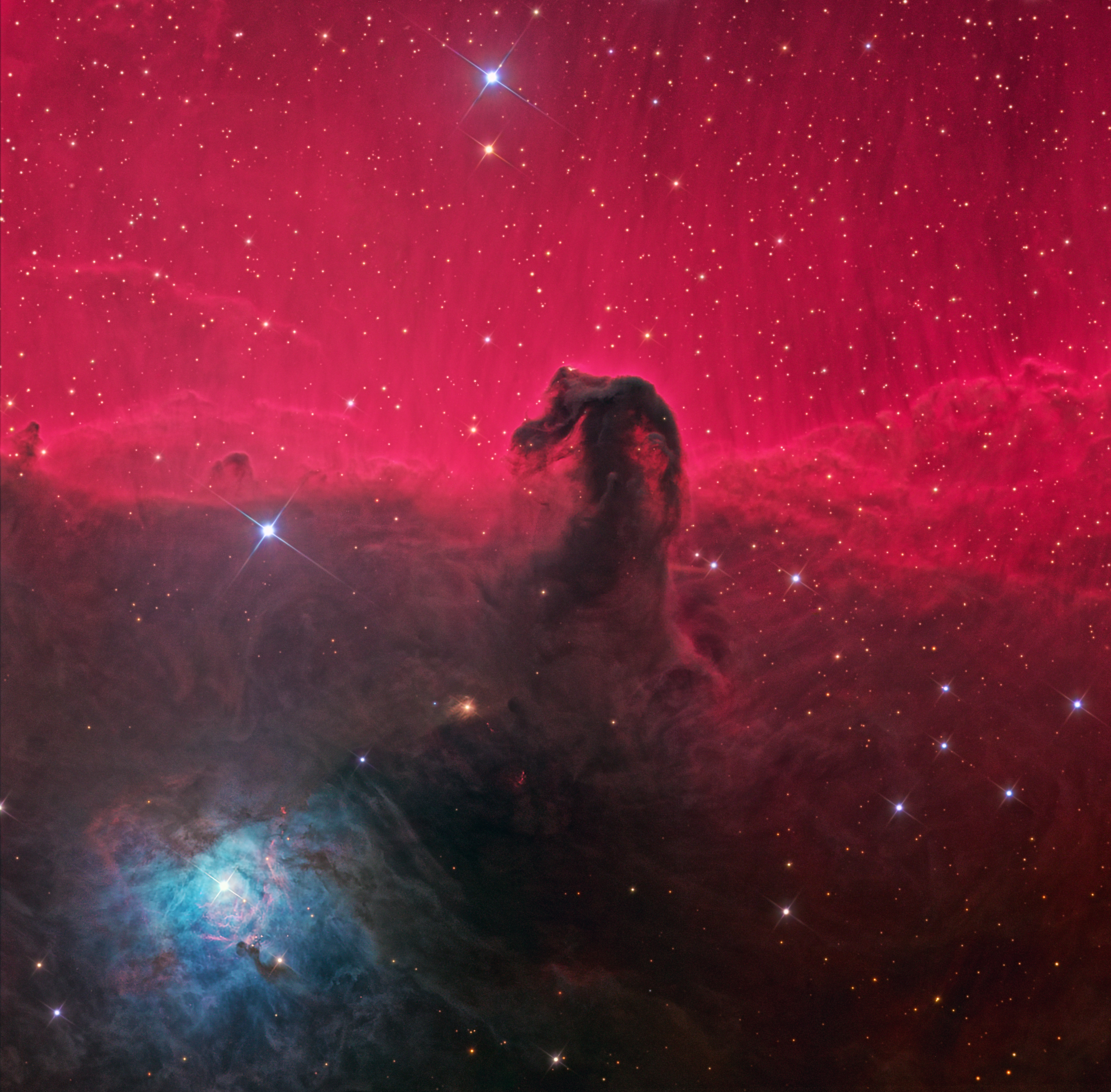
- NGC 2023 next to the Horsehead Nebula

Observation data: J2000 epoch
- Right ascension: 05^{h} 41^{m} 37.9^{s}
- Declination: −02° 15′ 52″
- Distance: 1,300 ly (400 pc) ly
- Apparent dimensions (V): 10'×10'
- Constellation: Orion
- Designations: NGC 2023, LBN 954, IRAS 05391-0217

NGC 2023 is an emission and reflection nebula in the equatorial constellation of Orion. It was discovered by the German-born astronomer William Herschel on 6 January 1785. This reflection nebula is one of the largest in the sky, with a size of 10 × 10 arcminutes. It is located at a distance of 1,300 ly (400 pc) from the Sun, and is positioned ~15′ to the northeast of the Horsehead Nebula.

This star-forming nebula forms part of the Orion B molecular cloud, or Lynds 1630, and is located in the northern section of this complex. In terms of stellar density, it is the poorest of the four clusters embedded in the cloud complex, with only 21 embedded infrared sources. The reflection nebula is illuminated by the Herbig Ae/Be star HD 37903, which has a spectral class of about B2 Ve. The region around the central star is radiating fluorescent molecular hydrogen emission at a near-infrared range. Infrared emission of polycyclic aromatic hydrocarbons has been detected from the nebula's dust.

== Gallery ==
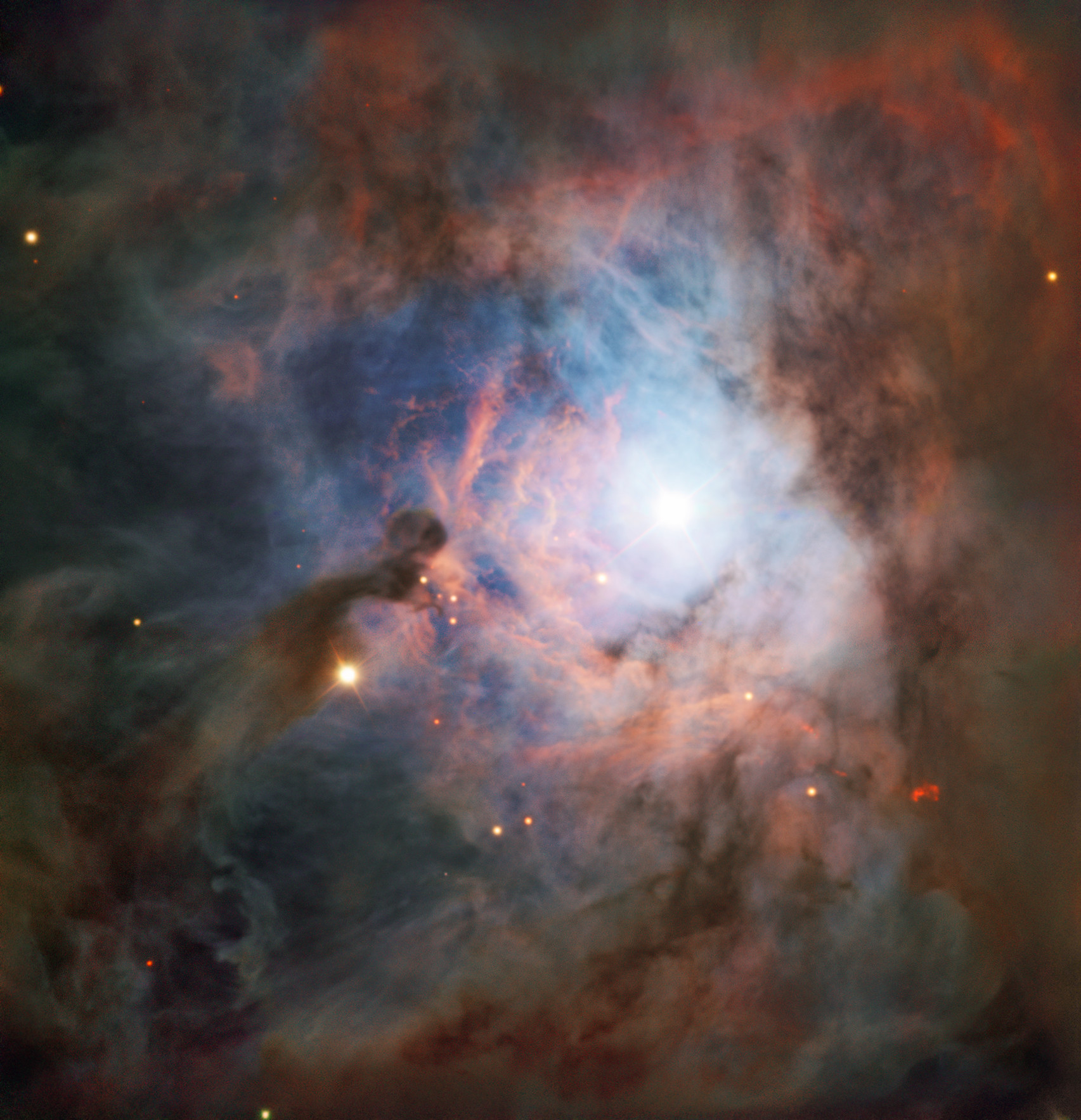
NGC 2023 taken with the VLT's FORS.

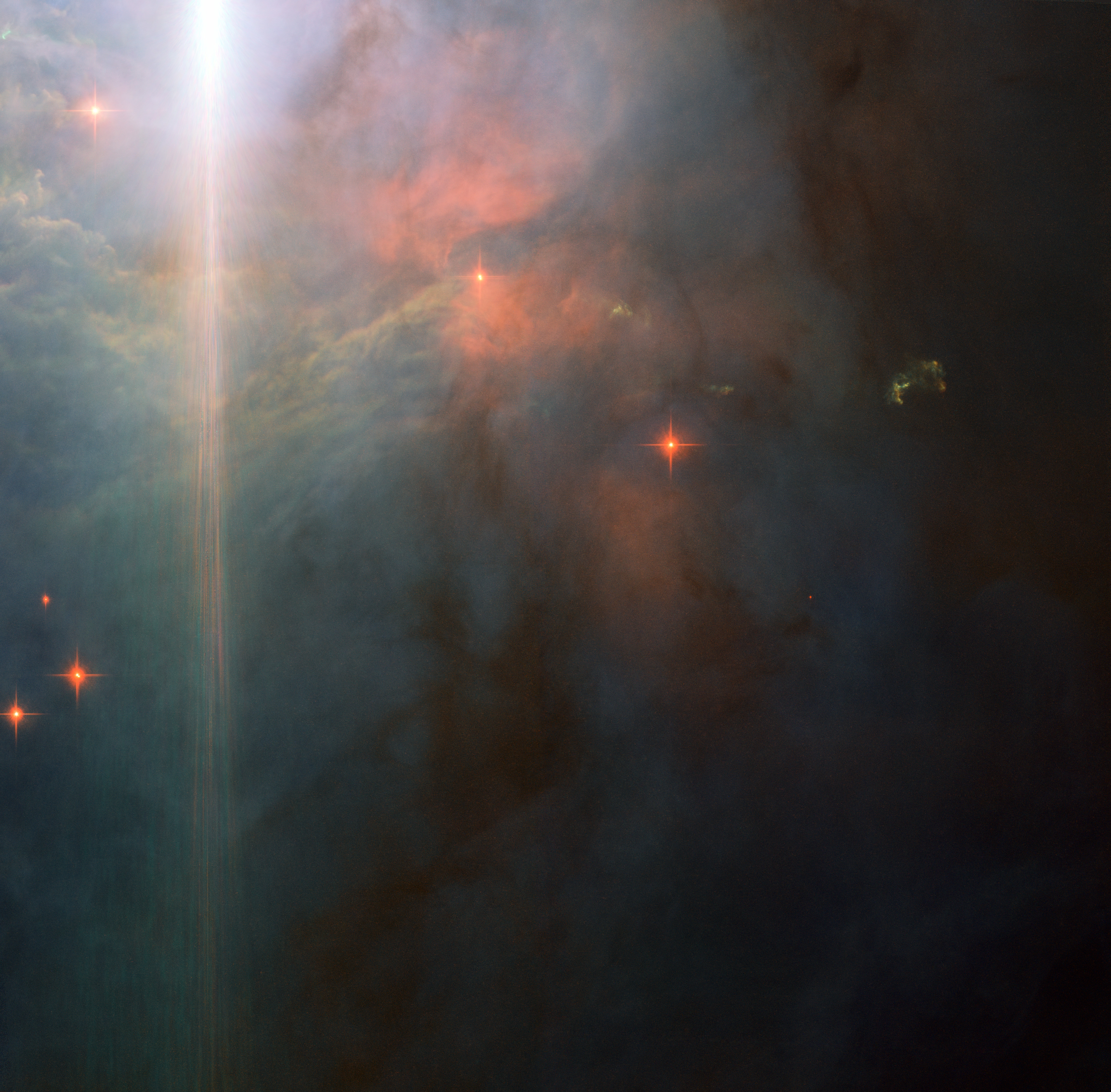
Southern detail of NGC 2023 (HST ACS)
