= FU Orionis =

Variable star in the constellation Orion

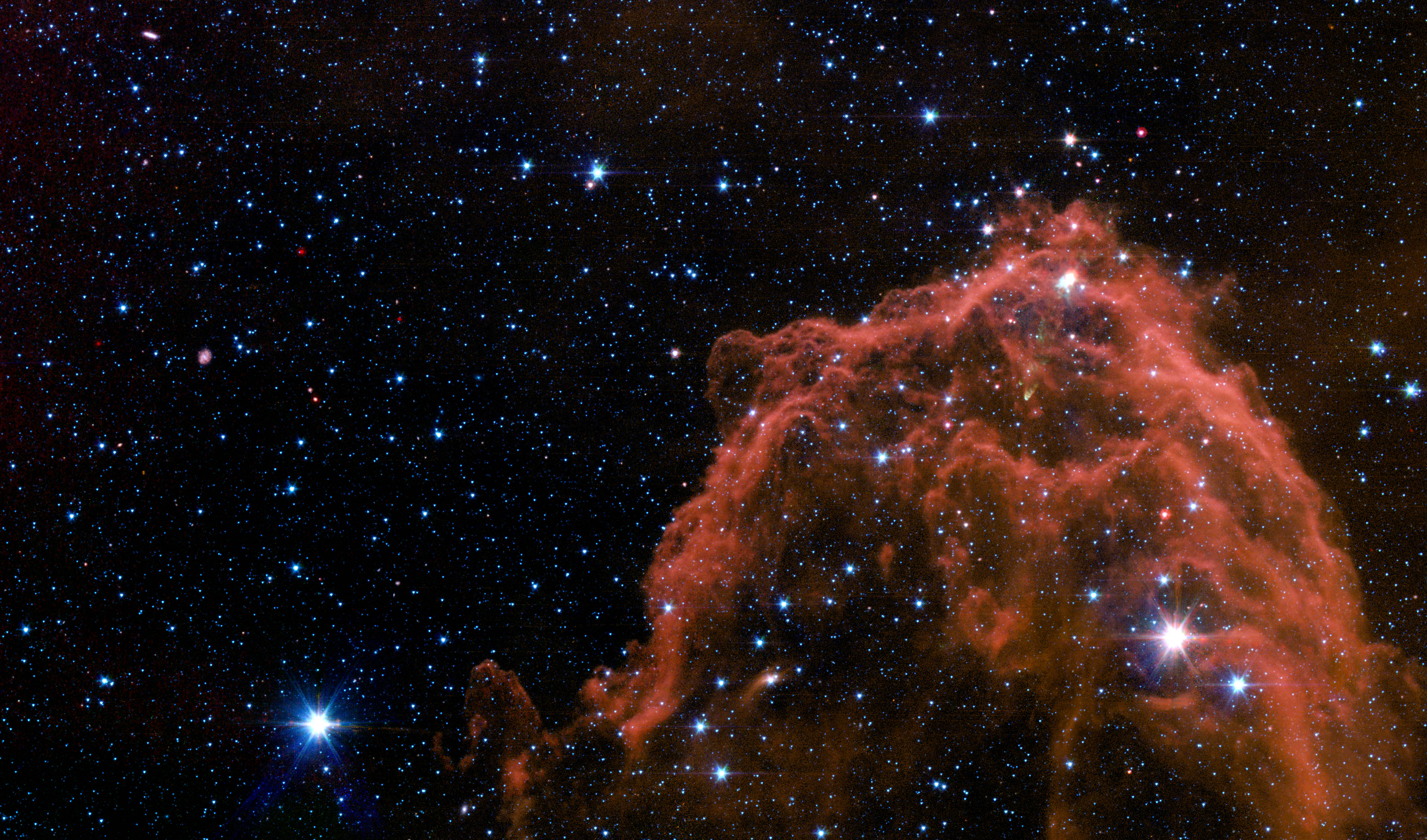
- Barnard 35, a part of the Lambda Orionis Ring seen by the Spitzer Space Telescope. FU Orionis is the bright star at lower right.

Observation data Epoch J2000 Equinox ICRS
- Constellation: Orion
- Right ascension: 05^{h} 45^{m} 22.362^{s}
- Declination: +09° 04′ 12.31″
- Apparent magnitude (V): 8.94

Characteristics
- Spectral type: variable + K5+2 −1
- B−V color index: 1.41
- Variable type: FU Ori

Astrometry
Proper motion (μ)	RA: +2.218±0.079 mas/yr Dec.: −2.834±0.065 mas/yr
Parallax (π)	2.4029±0.0497 mas
Distance	1,360 ± 30 ly (416 ± 9 pc)

Details

FU Orionis north
Mass	0.6 M_{☉}
Radius	10.42 R_{☉}
Temperature	5095.1 K

FU Orionis south
Mass	1.2 M_{☉}
Temperature	4350 K
Age	~2 Myr

Other designations
- FU Ori, BD+09°5427

Database references
SIMBAD	data

FU Orionis is a variable and binary star system in the constellation of Orion, that in 1937 rose in apparent visual magnitude from 16.5 to 9.6, and has since been around magnitude 9. The name FU Orionis is a variable star designation in the Argelander system, which are assigned sequentially as new variables are discovered. FU Orionis is about 1,360 light years distant and is associated with the molecular cloud Barnard 35.

For a long time this variable was considered unique, but in 1970 a similar star, V1057 Cygni, was discovered, and a number of additional examples have been discovered since then. These stars constitute the FU Orionis class of variable stars, GCVS type FU, often nicknamed FUors. These stars are pre–main sequence stars which display an extreme change in magnitude and spectral type.

== Stellar system ==
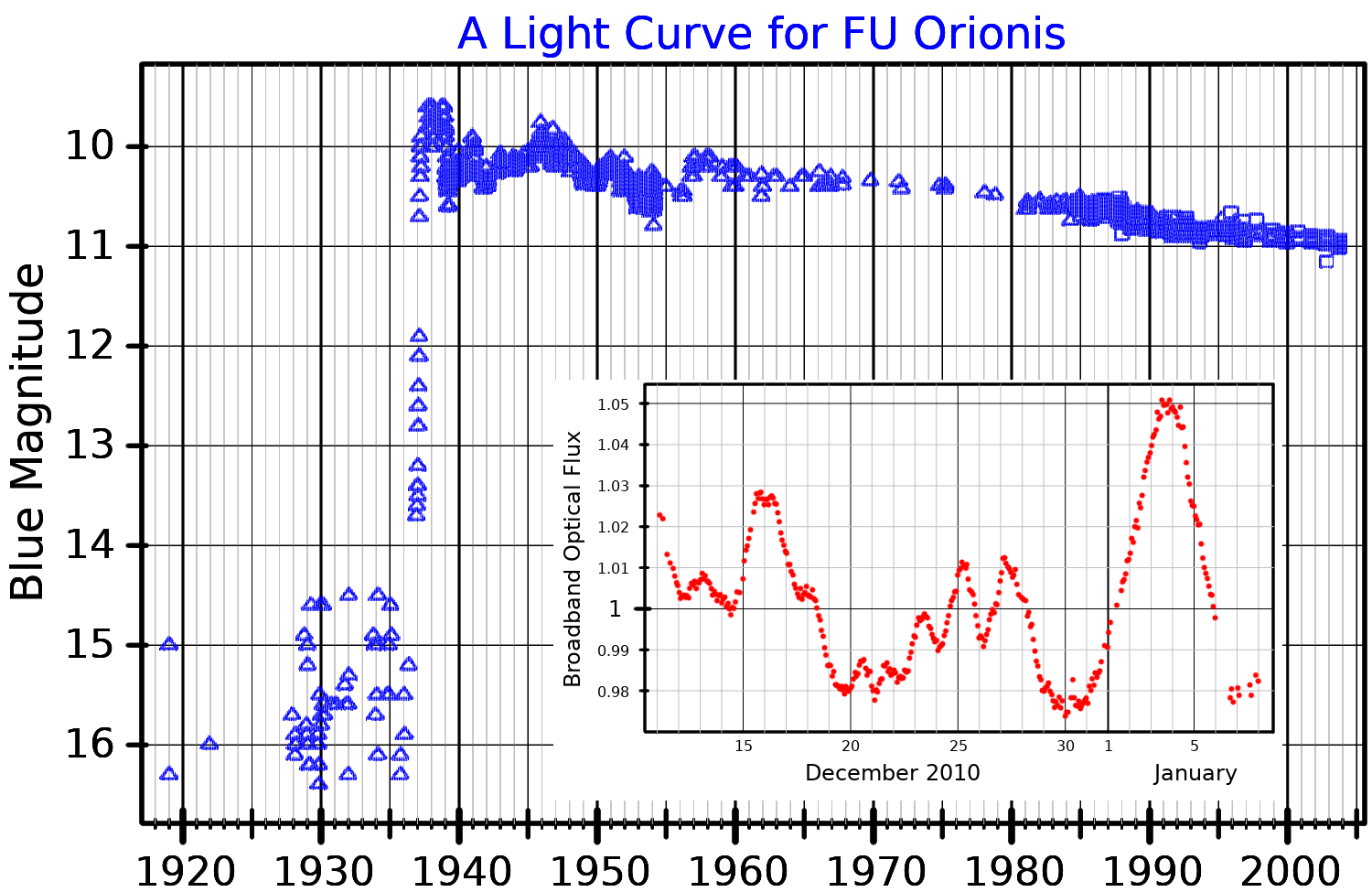
The blue band light curve for FU Orionis, adapted from Clarke et al. (2005). The inset plot, adapted from Siwak, et al. (2013), illustrates the short timescale variability.

FU Orionis consists of two components, both surrounded by a circumstellar disk. Both disks were resolved with ALMA. The primary is surrounded by a dust disk with a radius of 11 astronomical units and the secondary disk has a similar inclination and size. The disks are separated by about 250 au. The ^{12}CO emission show a complex kinematic environment and signatures of disk rotation, which are asymmetric. The asymmetry of the disk rotation is explained with interactions of the disks during a stellar flyby.

The primary, called FU Orionis north has a mass of 0.6 M_{☉} and accretes $3.8 \times 10^{-5}$ M_{☉} per year. The primary has a highly-variable spectral type and luminosity class. FU Orionis stars do not show strong emission lines during the outburst and have spectral features that resemble F- or G-type supergiants during the maximum. The outer parts of FU Orionis stars produce a K-M supergiant spectrum, which can be observed in the near-infrared. The secondary, called FU Orionis south could be the more massive component in the system with 1.2 M_{☉} and a spectral type of about K5.

== Nebula ==
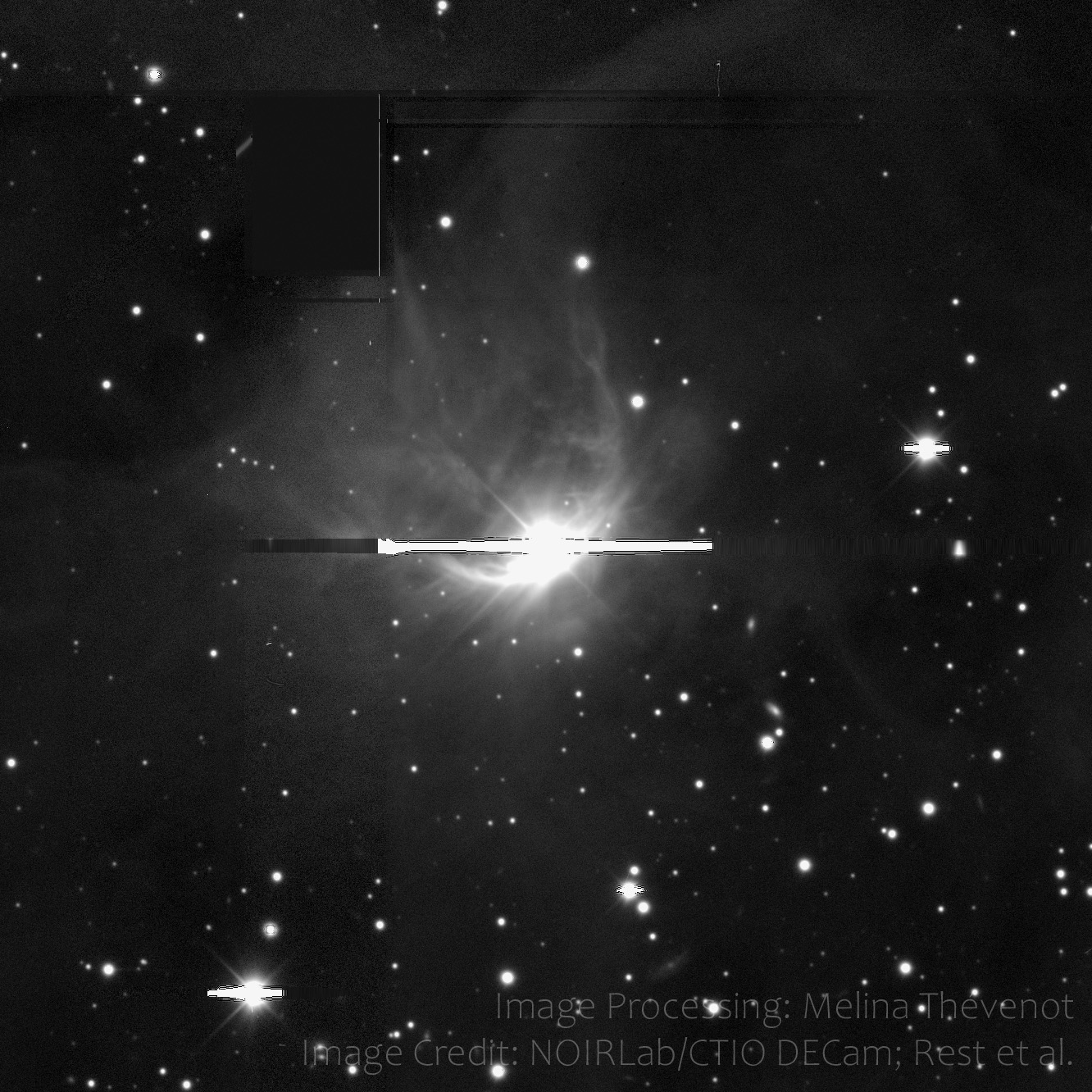
The arc-shaped Nebula with DECam, observed in 2017

FU Orionis is associated with the molecular cloud Barnard 35 (part of the Lambda Orionis Ring) and close to the star an arc-shaped nebula is visible. Other FU Orionis stars are associated with an arc-shaped reflection nebula that becomes visible as the star brightens.

== Hypothetical planet ==
A 2023 study proposed that FU Orionis north might be accreting matter from an evaporating planet about 6 times the mass of Jupiter. Simulations predict an extremely large radius of 14 R_{J} or around 1.4 R_{☉} at the beginning of the extreme evaporation event.

The FU Orionis planetary system
Companion (in order from star)	Mass	Semimajor axis (AU)	Orbital period (days)	Eccentricity	Inclination (°)	Radius
b (unconfirmed)	~6 M_{J}	~0.08	~10-12	—	—	~14 R_{J}
