= V1057 Cygni =

Star in the constellation Cygnus

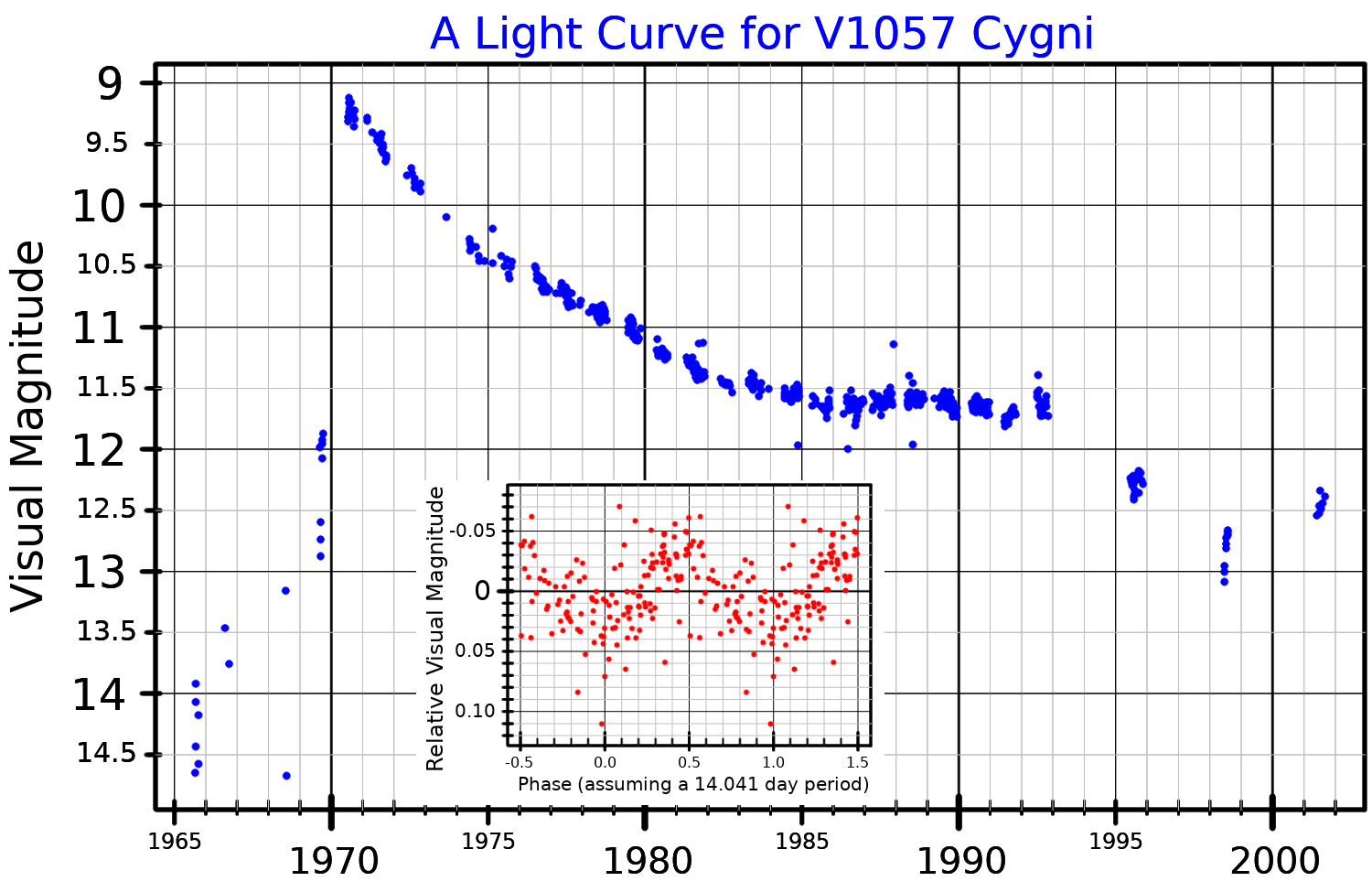
- A visual band light curve for V1057 Cygni. The main plot shows the long-term variability, and the inset shows the short-term variability. Adapted from Kopatskaya et al. (2002) and Clarke et al. (2005).

Observation data Epoch J2000.0 Equinox J2000.0 (ICRS)
- Constellation: Cygnus
- Right ascension: 20^{h} 58^{m} 53.73367^{s}
- Declination: +44° 15′ 28.3847″
- Apparent magnitude (V): 12.43±0.03

Characteristics
- Spectral type: F7/G3 I/IIe
- B−V color index: 1.93
- Variable type: FU Ori

Astrometry
Proper motion (μ)	RA: −2.793 mas/yr Dec.: −3.813 mas/yr
Parallax (π)	1.0864±0.0388 mas
Distance	3,000 ± 100 ly (920 ± 30 pc)

Details
Radius	16.2+1.2 −3.2 R_{☉}
Luminosity	38.3±2.0 L_{☉}
Temperature	3,565+414 −127 K

Other designations
- V1057 Cyg, LkHα 190, AAVSO 2055+43

Database references
SIMBAD	data

V1057 Cygni is a suspected binary star system in the northern constellation of Cygnus. It is a variable star of the FU Orionis-type, and was the second FU Orionis-type variable to be discovered. The system is located at a distance of approximately 3,000 light years from the Sun, in the North America Nebula. It has an apparent visual magnitude of around 12.4.

The initial classification of the primary was as a young T Tauri star. During 1969–1970 it underwent a nova-like outburst, increasing in brightness by five magnitudes and emitting a strong mass outflow. For the next ten years the brightness stayed at a plateau before decreasing rapidly in the mid–1990s, accompanied by a change in its spectrum. As of 2026, it is 3.5 to 3.6 magnitudes brighter than it was before the nova-like event. The mass of FU Ori objects is estimated to be in the range of 0.3–0.7 M_{☉}.

A faint binary companion was discovered in 2016, and designated component B. It is located at a projected separation of 30±5 AU from the primary, with a possible orbital period of ~300 years. The 1970 outburst of the primary may have been caused by torque of its accretion disk by the companion.
