= Stellar kinematics =

Study of the movement of stars

Barnard's Star, showing position every 5 years in the period 1985–2005. Barnard's Star is the star with the highest proper motion.

In astronomy, stellar kinematics is the observational study or measurement of the kinematics or motions of stars through space.

Stellar kinematics encompasses the measurement of stellar velocities in the Milky Way and its satellites as well as the internal kinematics of more distant galaxies. Measurement of the kinematics of stars in different subcomponents of the Milky Way including the thin disk, the thick disk, the bulge, and the stellar halo provides important information about the formation and evolutionary history of our Galaxy. Kinematic measurements can also identify exotic phenomena such as hypervelocity stars escaping from the Milky Way, which are interpreted as the result of gravitational encounters of binary stars with the supermassive black hole at the Galactic Center.

Stellar kinematics is related to but distinct from the subject of stellar dynamics, which involves the theoretical study or modeling of the motions of stars under the influence of gravity. Stellar-dynamical models of systems such as galaxies or star clusters are often compared with or tested against stellar-kinematic data to study their evolutionary history and mass distributions, and to detect the presence of dark matter or supermassive black holes through their gravitational influence on stellar orbits.

== Space velocity ==
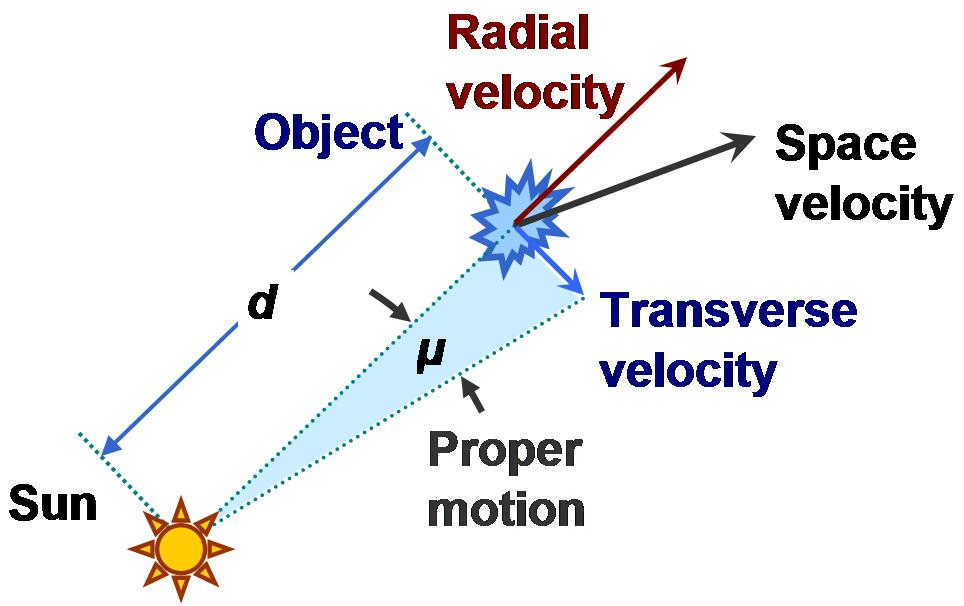
Relation between proper motion and velocity components of an object. At emission, the object was at distance d from the Sun, and moved at angular rate μ radian/s, that is, μ = v_{t} / d with v_{t} = the component of velocity transverse to line of sight from the Sun. (The diagram illustrates an angle μ swept out in unit time at tangential velocity v_{t}.)

The component of stellar motion toward or away from the Sun, known as radial velocity, can be measured from the spectrum shift caused by the Doppler effect. The transverse, or proper motion must be found by taking a series of positional determinations against more distant objects. Once the distance to a star is determined through astrometric means such as parallax, the space velocity can be computed. This is the star's actual motion relative to the Sun or the local standard of rest (LSR). The latter is typically taken as a position at the Sun's present location that is following a circular orbit around the Galactic Center at the mean velocity of those nearby stars with low velocity dispersion. The Sun's motion with respect to the LSR is called the "peculiar solar motion".

The components of space velocity in the Milky Way's Galactic coordinate system are usually designated U, V, and W, given in km/s, with U positive in the direction of the Galactic Center, V positive in the direction of galactic rotation, and W positive in the direction of the North Galactic Pole. The peculiar motion of the Sun with respect to the LSR is

(U, V, W) = (11.1, 12.24, 7.25) km/s,

with statistical uncertainty (+0.69−0.75, +0.47−0.47, +0.37−0.36) km/s and systematic uncertainty (1, 2, 0.5) km/s. (Note that V is 7 km/s larger than estimated in 1998 by Dehnen et al.)

== Use of kinematic measurements ==
Stellar kinematics yields important astrophysical information about stars, and the galaxies in which they reside. Stellar kinematics data combined with astrophysical modeling produces important information about the galactic system as a whole. Measured stellar velocities in the innermost regions of galaxies including the Milky Way have provided evidence that many galaxies host supermassive black holes at their center. In farther out regions of galaxies such as within the galactic halo, velocity measurements of globular clusters orbiting in these halo regions of galaxies provides evidence for dark matter. Both of these cases derive from the key fact that stellar kinematics can be related to the overall potential in which the stars are bound. This means that if accurate stellar kinematics measurements are made for a star or group of stars orbiting in a certain region of a galaxy, the gravitational potential and mass distribution can be inferred given that the gravitational potential in which the star is bound produces its orbit and serves as the impetus for its stellar motion. Examples of using kinematics combined with modeling to construct an astrophysical system include:

- Rotation of the Milky Way's disc: From the proper motions and radial velocities of stars within the Milky way disc one can show that there is differential rotation. When combining these measurements of stars' proper motions and their radial velocities, along with careful modeling, it is possible to obtain a picture of the rotation of the Milky Way disc. The local character of galactic rotation in the solar neighborhood is encapsulated in the Oort constants.
- Structural components of the Milky Way: Using stellar kinematics, astronomers construct models which seek to explain the overall galactic structure in terms of distinct kinematic populations of stars. This is possible because these distinct populations are often located in specific regions of galaxies. For example, within the Milky Way, there are three primary components, each with its own distinct stellar kinematics: the disc, halo and bulge or bar. These kinematic groups are closely related to the stellar populations in the Milky Way, forming a strong correlation between the motion and chemical composition, thus indicating different formation mechanisms. For the Milky Way, the speed of disk stars is $\mathrm{V} = 220 ~ \mathrm{km} ~ \mathrm{ s} ^{-1}$ and an RMS (Root mean square) velocity relative to this speed of $\mathrm{V_{RMS}} = 50 ~ \mathrm{km} ~ \mathrm{ s} ^{-1}$. For bulge population stars, the velocities are randomly oriented with a larger relative RMS velocity of $\mathrm{V_{RMS}} = 150 ~ \mathrm{km} ~ \mathrm{s}^{-1}$ and no net circular velocity. The Galactic stellar halo consists of stars with orbits that extend to the outer regions of the galaxy. Some of these stars will continually orbit far from the galactic center, while others are on trajectories which bring them to various distances from the galactic center. These stars have little to no average rotation. Many stars in this group belong to globular clusters which formed long ago and thus have a distinct formation history, which can be inferred from their kinematics and poor metallicities. The halo may be further subdivided into an inner and outer halo, with the inner halo having a net prograde motion with respect to the Milky Way and the outer a net retrograde motion.
- External galaxies: Spectroscopic observations of external galaxies make it possible to characterize the bulk motions of the stars they contain. While these stellar populations in external galaxies are generally not resolved to the level where one can track the motion of individual stars (except for the very nearest galaxies) measurements of the kinematics of the integrated stellar population along the line of sight provides information including the mean velocity and the velocity dispersion which can then be used to infer the distribution of mass within the galaxy. Measurement of the mean velocity as a function of position gives information on the galaxy's rotation, with distinct regions of the galaxy that are redshifted / blueshifted in relation to the galaxy's systemic velocity.
- Mass distributions: Through measurement of the kinematics of tracer objects such as globular clusters and the orbits of nearby satellite dwarf galaxies, we can determine the mass distribution of the Milky Way or other galaxies. This is accomplished by combining kinematic measurements with dynamical modeling.

== Recent advancements due to Gaia ==
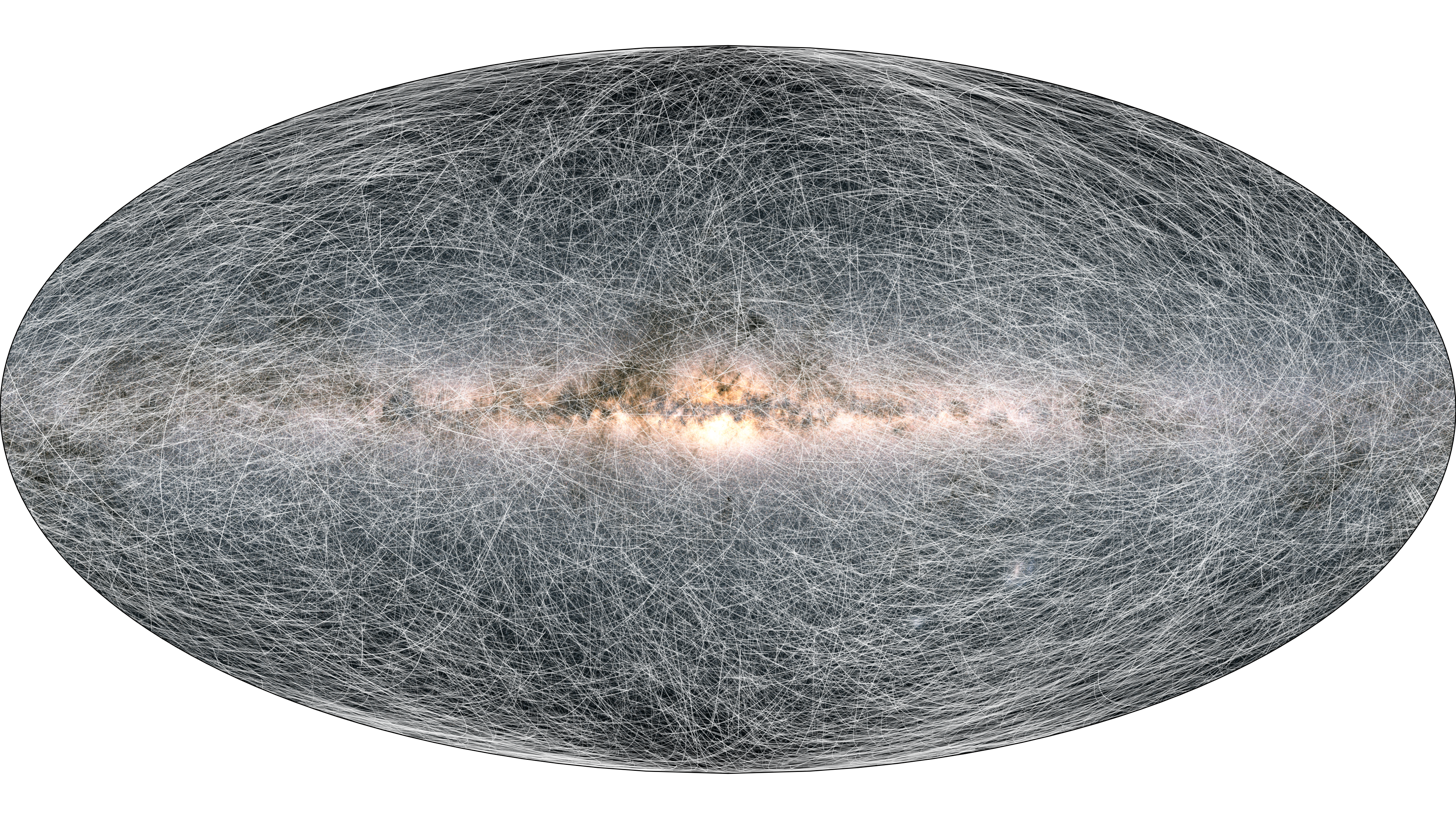
Expected motion of 40,000 stars in the next 400 thousand years, as determined by Gaia EDR3

In 2018, the Gaia Data Release 2 (GAIA DR2) marked a significant advancement in stellar kinematics, offering a rich dataset of precise measurements. This release included detailed stellar kinematic and stellar parallax data, contributing to a more nuanced understanding of the Milky Way's structure. Notably, it facilitated the determination of proper motions for numerous celestial objects, including the absolute proper motions of 75 globular clusters situated at distances extending up to $G=21$ and a bright limit of $G\approx$ $3$. Furthermore, Gaia's comprehensive dataset enabled the measurement of absolute proper motions in nearby dwarf spheroidal galaxies, serving as crucial indicators for understanding the mass distribution within the Milky Way. GAIA DR3 improved the quality of previously published data by providing detailed astrophysical parameters. While the complete GAIA DR4 is yet to be unveiled, the latest release offers enhanced insights into white dwarfs, hypervelocity stars, cosmological gravitational lensing, and the merger history of the Galaxy.

== Stellar kinematic types ==
Stars within galaxies may be classified based on their kinematics. For example, the stars in the Milky Way can be subdivided into two general populations, based on their metallicity, or proportion of elements with atomic numbers higher than helium. Among nearby stars, it has been found that population I stars with higher metallicity are generally located in the stellar disk while older population II stars are in random orbits with little net rotation. The latter have elliptical orbits that are inclined to the plane of the Milky Way. Comparison of the kinematics of nearby stars has also led to the identification of stellar associations. These are most likely groups of stars that share a common point of origin in giant molecular clouds.

There are many additional ways to classify stars based on their measured velocity components, and this provides detailed information about the nature of the star's formation time, its present location, and the general structure of the galaxy. As a star moves in a galaxy, the smoothed out gravitational potential of all the other stars and other mass within the galaxy plays a dominant role in determining the stellar motion. Stellar kinematics can provide insights into the location of where the star formed within the galaxy. Measurements of an individual star's kinematics can identify stars that are peculiar outliers such as a high-velocity star moving much faster than its nearby neighbors.

=== High-velocity stars ===
Depending on the definition, a high-velocity star is a star moving faster than 65 km/s to 100 km/s relative to the average motion of the other stars in the star's neighborhood. The velocity is also sometimes defined as supersonic relative to the surrounding interstellar medium. The three types of high-velocity stars are: runaway stars, halo stars and hypervelocity stars. High-velocity stars were studied by Jan Oort, who used their kinematic data to predict that high-velocity stars have very little tangential velocity.

==== Runaway stars ====
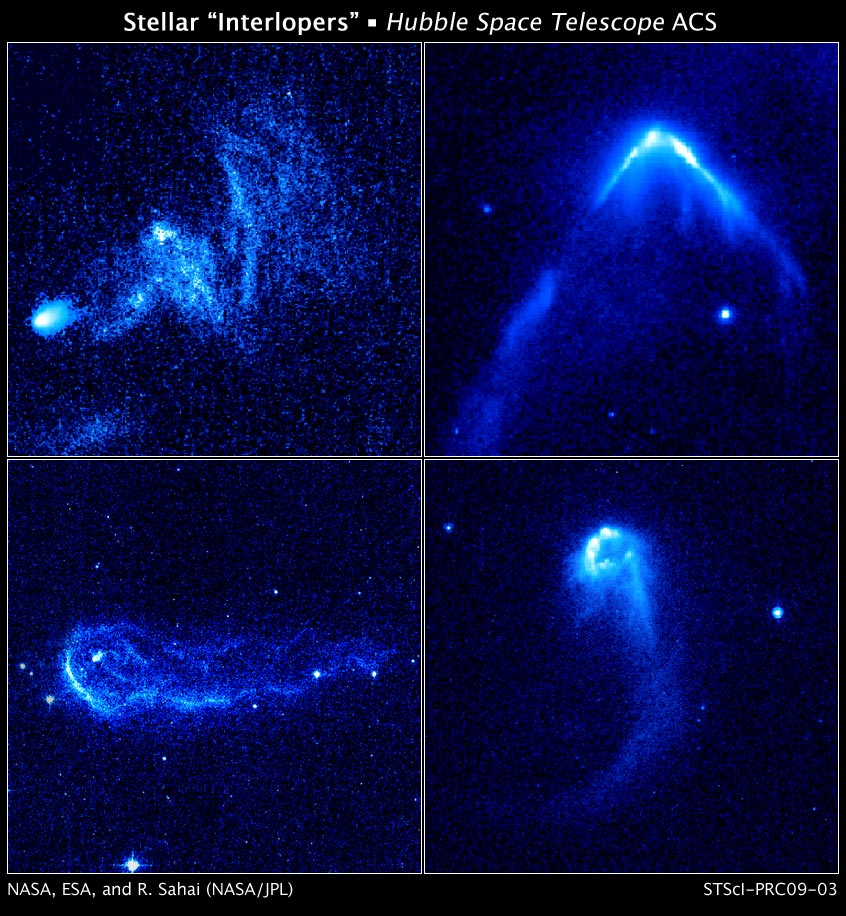
Four runaway stars moving through regions of dense interstellar gas and creating bright bow waves and trailing tails of glowing gas. The stars in these NASA Hubble Space Telescope images are among 14 young runaway stars spotted by the Advanced Camera for Surveys between October 2005 and July 2006.

A runaway star is one that is moving through space with an abnormally high velocity relative to the surrounding interstellar medium. The proper motion of a runaway star often points exactly away from a stellar association, of which the star was formerly a member, before it was hurled out.

Mechanisms that may give rise to a runaway star include:

- Gravitational interactions between stars in a stellar system can result in large accelerations of one or more of the involved stars. In some cases, stars may even be ejected. This can occur in seemingly stable star systems of only three stars, as described in studies of the three-body problem in gravitational theory.
- A collision or close encounter between stellar systems, including galaxies, may result in the disruption of both systems, with some of the stars being accelerated to high velocities, or even ejected. A large-scale example is the gravitational interaction between the Milky Way and the Large Magellanic Cloud.
- A supernova explosion in a multiple star system can accelerate both the supernova remnant and remaining stars to high velocities.

Multiple mechanisms may accelerate the same runaway star. For example, a massive star that was originally ejected due to gravitational interactions with its stellar neighbors may itself go supernova, producing a remnant with a velocity modulated by the supernova kick. If this supernova occurs in the very nearby vicinity of other stars, it is possible that it may produce more runaways in the process.

An example of a related set of runaway stars is the case of AE Aurigae, 53 Arietis and Mu Columbae, all of which are moving away from each other at velocities of over 100 km/s (for comparison, the Sun moves through the Milky Way at about 20 km/s faster than the local average). Tracing their motions back, their paths intersect near to the Orion Nebula about 2 million years ago. Barnard's Loop is believed to be the remnant of the supernova that launched the other stars.

Another example is the X-ray object Vela X-1, where photodigital techniques reveal the presence of a typical supersonic bow shock hyperbola.

==== Halo stars ====
Halo stars are very old stars that have a low metallicity and do not follow circular orbits around the center of the Milky Way within its disk. Instead, the halo stars travel in elliptical orbits, often inclined to the disk, which take them well above and below the plane of the Milky Way. Although their orbital velocities relative to the Milky Way may be no faster than disk stars, their different paths result in high relative velocities.

Typical examples are the halo stars passing through the disk of the Milky Way at steep angles. One of the nearest 45 stars, called Kapteyn's Star, is an example of the high-velocity stars that lie near the Sun: Its observed radial velocity is −245 km/s, and the components of its space velocity are u = +19 km/s, v = −288 km/s, and w = −52 km/s.

==== Hypervelocity stars ====
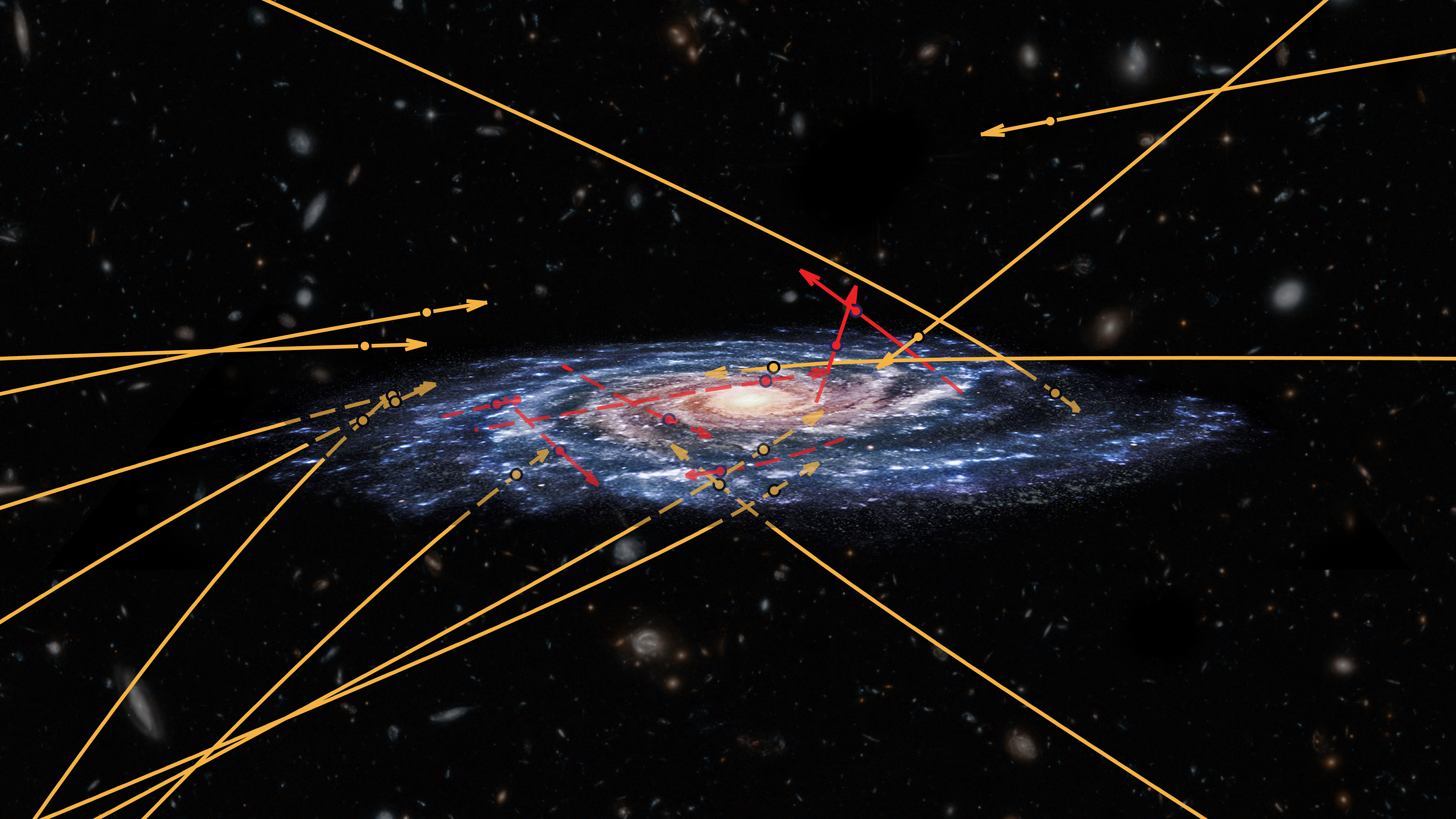
Positions and trajectories of 20 high-velocity stars as reconstructed from data acquired by Gaia, overlaid on top of an artistic view of the Milky Way

Hypervelocity stars (designated as HVS or HV in stellar catalogues) have substantially higher velocities than the rest of the stellar population of a galaxy. Some of these stars may even exceed the escape velocity of the galaxy. In the Milky Way, stars usually have velocities on the order of 100 km/s, whereas hypervelocity stars typically have velocities on the order of 1000 km/s. Most of these fast-moving stars are thought to be produced near the center of the Milky Way, where there is a larger population of these objects than further out. One of the fastest known stars in our Galaxy is the O-class sub-dwarf US 708, which is moving away from the Milky Way with a total velocity of around 1200 km/s.

Jack G. Hills first predicted the existence of HVSs in 1988. This was later confirmed in 2005 by Warren Brown, Margaret Geller, Scott Kenyon, and Michael Kurtz. As of 2008, 10 unbound HVSs were known, one of which is believed to have originated from the Large Magellanic Cloud rather than the Milky Way. Further measurements placed its origin within the Milky Way. Due to uncertainty about the distribution of mass within the Milky Way, determining whether a HVS is unbound is difficult. A further five known high-velocity stars may be unbound from the Milky Way, and 16 HVSs are thought to be bound. The nearest currently known HVS (HVS2) is about 19 kpc from the Sun.

As of 1 September 2017, there have been roughly 20 observed hypervelocity stars. Though most of these were observed in the Northern Hemisphere, the possibility remains that there are HVSs only observable from the Southern Hemisphere.

It is believed that about 1,000 HVSs exist in the Milky Way. Considering that there are around 100 billion stars in the Milky Way, this is a minuscule fraction (~0.000001%). Results from the second data release of Gaia (DR2) show that most high-velocity late-type stars have a high probability of being bound to the Milky Way. However, distant hypervelocity star candidates are more promising.

In March 2019, LAMOST-HVS1 was reported to be a confirmed hypervelocity star ejected from the stellar disk of the Milky Way.

In July 2019, astronomers reported finding an A-type star, S5-HVS1, traveling 1,755 km/s (3,930,000 mph), faster than any other star detected so far. The star is in the southern constellation of Grus, the crane, and is about 29,000 ly (1.8×10^{9} AU) from Earth. It may have been ejected from the Milky Way after interacting with Sagittarius A*, the supermassive black hole at the center of the galaxy.

===== Origin of hypervelocity stars =====
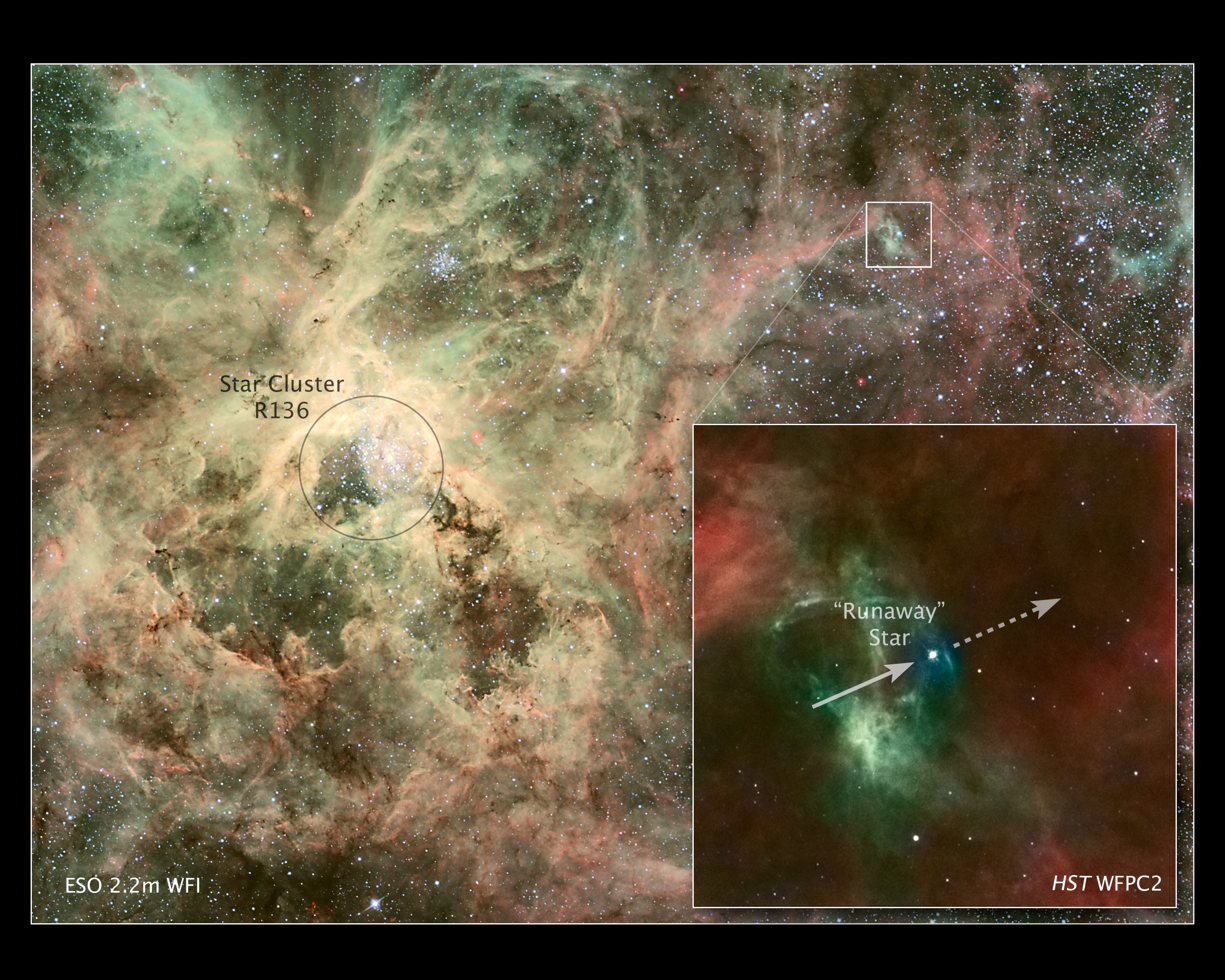
Runaway star speeding from 30 Doradus. Image taken by the Hubble Space Telescope.

HVSs are believed to predominantly originate by close encounters of binary stars with the supermassive black hole in the center of the Milky Way. One of the two partners is gravitationally captured by the black hole (in the sense of entering orbit around it), while the other escapes with high velocity, becoming a HVS. Known as the Hills mechanism, this is analogous to the capture and ejection of interstellar objects by a star.

Supernova-induced HVSs may also be possible, although they are presumably rare. In this scenario, a HVS is ejected from a close binary system as a result of the companion star undergoing a supernova explosion. Ejection velocities up to 770 km/s, as measured from the galactic rest frame, are possible for late-type B-stars. This mechanism can explain the origin of HVSs which are ejected from the galactic disk.

Known HVSs are main-sequence stars with masses a few times that of the Sun. HVSs with smaller masses are also expected and G/K-dwarf HVS candidates have been found.

Some HVSs may have originated from a disrupted dwarf galaxy. When it made its closest approach to the center of the Milky Way, some of its stars broke free and were thrown into space, due to the slingshot-like effect of the boost.

Some neutron stars are inferred to be traveling with similar speeds. This could be related to HVSs and the HVS ejection mechanism. Neutron stars are the remnants of supernova explosions, and their extreme speeds are very likely the result of an asymmetric supernova explosion or the loss of their near partner during the supernova explosions that forms them. The neutron star RX J0822-4300, which was measured to move at a record speed of over 1,500 km/s (0.5% of the speed of light) in 2007 by the Chandra X-ray Observatory, is thought to have been produced the first way.

One theory regarding the ignition of Type Ia supernovae invokes the onset of a merger between two white dwarfs in a binary star system, triggering the explosion of the more massive white dwarf. If the less massive white dwarf is not destroyed during the explosion, it will no longer be gravitationally bound to its destroyed companion, causing it to leave the system as a hypervelocity star with its pre-explosion orbital velocity of 1000–2500 km/s. In 2018, three such stars were discovered using data from the Gaia satellite.

===== Partial list of HVSs =====
As of 2014, twenty HVS were known.

- HVS 1 – (SDSS J090744.99+024506.8) (a.k.a. The Outcast Star) – the first hypervelocity star to be discovered
- HVS 2 – (SDSS J093320.86+441705.4 or US 708)
- HVS 3 – (HE 0437-5439) – possibly from the Large Magellanic Cloud
- HVS 4 – (SDSS J091301.00+305120.0)
- HVS 5 – (SDSS J091759.42+672238.7)
- HVS 6 – (SDSS J110557.45+093439.5)
- HVS 7 – (SDSS J113312.12+010824.9)
- HVS 8 – (SDSS J094214.04+200322.1)
- HVS 9 – (SDSS J102137.08-005234.8)
- HVS 10 – (SDSS J120337.85+180250.4)
- CWISE J1249+3621
- RX J0822−4300
- S5-HVS1

== Kinematic groups ==
A set of stars with similar space motion and ages is known as a kinematic group. These are stars that could share a common origin, such as the evaporation of an open cluster, the remains of a star forming region, or collections of overlapping star formation bursts at differing time periods in adjacent regions. Most stars are born within molecular clouds known as stellar nurseries. The stars formed within such a cloud compose gravitationally bound open clusters containing dozens to thousands of members with similar ages and compositions. These clusters dissociate with time. Groups of young stars that escape a cluster, or are no longer bound to each other, form stellar associations. As these stars age and disperse, their association is no longer readily apparent and they become moving groups of stars.

Astronomers are able to determine if stars are members of a kinematic group because they share the same age, metallicity, and kinematics (radial velocity and proper motion). As the stars in a moving group formed in proximity and at nearly the same time from the same gas cloud, although later disrupted by tidal forces, they share similar characteristics.

=== Stellar associations ===
A stellar association is a very loose star cluster, whose stars share a common origin and are still moving together through space, but have become gravitationally unbound. Associations are primarily identified by their common movement vectors and ages. Identification by chemical composition is also used to factor in association memberships.

Stellar associations were first discovered by the Armenian astronomer Viktor Ambartsumian in 1947. The conventional name for an association uses the names or abbreviations of the constellation (or constellations) in which they are located; the association type, and, sometimes, a numerical identifier.

==== Types ====
Infrared ESO's VISTA view of a stellar nursery in Monoceros

Viktor Ambartsumian first categorized stellar associations into two groups, OB and T, based on the properties of their stars. A third category, R, was later suggested by Sidney van den Bergh for associations that illuminate reflection nebulae. The OB, T, and R associations form a continuum of young stellar groupings. But it is currently uncertain whether they are an evolutionary sequence, or represent some other factor at work. Some groups also display properties of both OB and T associations, so the categorization is not always clear-cut.

==== OB associations ====
Carina OB1, a large OB association

Young associations will contain 10 to 100 massive stars of spectral class O and B, and are known as OB associations. In addition, these associations also contain hundreds or thousands of low- and intermediate-mass stars. Association members are believed to form within the same small volume inside a giant molecular cloud. Once the surrounding dust and gas is blown away, the remaining stars become unbound and begin to drift apart. It is believed that the majority of all stars in the Milky Way were formed in OB associations. O-class stars are short-lived, and will expire as supernovae after roughly one million years. As a result, OB associations are generally only a few million years in age or less. The O-B stars in the association will have burned all their fuel within ten million years. (Compare this to the current age of the Sun at about five billion years.)

The Hipparcos satellite provided measurements that located a dozen OB associations within 650 parsecs of the Sun. The nearest OB association is the Scorpius–Centaurus association, located about 400 light-years from the Sun.

OB associations have also been found in the Large Magellanic Cloud and the Andromeda Galaxy. These associations can be quite sparse, spanning 1,500 light-years in diameter.

==== T associations ====
Young stellar groups can contain a number of infant T Tauri stars that are still in the process of entering the main sequence. These sparse populations of up to a thousand T Tauri stars are known as T associations. The nearest example is the Taurus-Auriga T association (Tau–Aur T association), located at a distance of 140 parsecs from the Sun. Other examples of T associations include the R Corona Australis T association, the Lupus T association, the Chamaeleon T association and the Velorum T association. T associations are often found in the vicinity of the molecular cloud from which they formed. Some, but not all, include O–B class stars. Group members have the same age and origin, the same chemical composition, and the same amplitude and direction in their vector of velocity.

==== R associations ====
Associations of stars that illuminate reflection nebulae are called R associations, a name suggested by Sidney van den Bergh after he discovered that the stars in these nebulae had a non-uniform distribution. These young stellar groupings contain main sequence stars that are not sufficiently massive to disperse the interstellar clouds in which they formed. This allows the properties of the surrounding dark cloud to be examined by astronomers. Because R associations are more plentiful than OB associations, they can be used to trace out the structure of the galactic spiral arms. An example of an R association is Monoceros R2, located 830 ± 50 parsecs from the Sun.

=== Moving groups ===
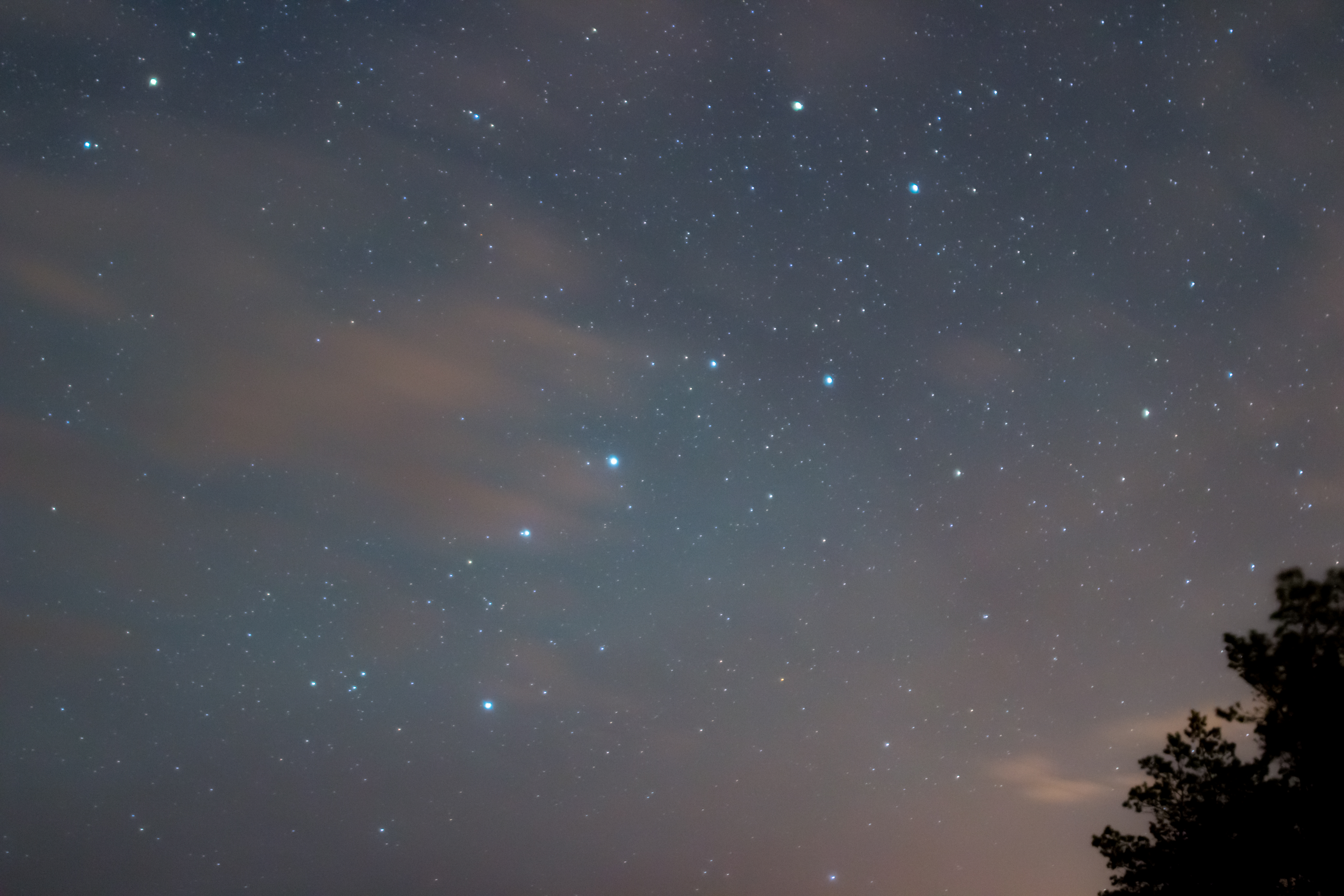
Ursa Major Moving Group, the closest stellar moving group to Earth

If the remnants of a stellar association drift through the Milky Way as a somewhat coherent assemblage, then they are termed a moving group or kinematic group. Moving groups can be old, such as the HR 1614 moving group at two billion years, or young, such as the AB Dor Moving Group at only 120 million years.

Moving groups were studied intensely by Olin Eggen in the 1960s. A list of the nearest young moving groups has been compiled by López-Santiago et al. The closest is the Ursa Major Moving Group which includes all of the stars in the Plough / Big Dipper asterism except for Dubhe and Alkaid. This is sufficiently close that the Sun lies in its outer fringes, without being part of the group. Hence, although members are concentrated at declinations near 60°N, some outliers are as far away across the sky as Triangulum Australe at 70°S.

The list of young moving groups is constantly evolving. The Banyan Σ tool currently lists 29 nearby young moving groups (Note: See Gagné, Jonathan; Mamajek, Eric E.; Malo, Lison; Riedel, Adric; Rodriguez, David; Lafrenière, David; Faherty, Jacqueline K.; Roy-Loubier, Olivier; Pueyo, Laurent; Robin, Annie C.; Doyon, René (2018). "Figures 4 & 5 of Gagné et al. 2018a". The Astrophysical Journal. 856 (1): 23. arXiv:1801.09051. Bibcode:2018ApJ...856...23G. doi:10.3847/1538-4357/aaae09. S2CID 119185386.) Recent additions to nearby moving groups are the Volans-Carina Association (VCA), discovered with Gaia, and the Argus Association (ARG), confirmed with Gaia. Moving groups can sometimes be further subdivided in smaller distinct groups. The Great Austral Young Association (GAYA) complex was found to be subdivided into the moving groups Carina, Columba, and Tucana-Horologium. The three Associations are not very distinct from each other, and have similar kinematic properties.

Young moving groups have well known ages and can support the characterization of objects with hard-to-estimate ages, such as brown dwarfs. Members of nearby young moving groups are also candidates for directly imaged protoplanetary disks, such as TW Hydrae or directly imaged exoplanets, such as Beta Pictoris b or GU Psc b.

=== Stellar streams ===
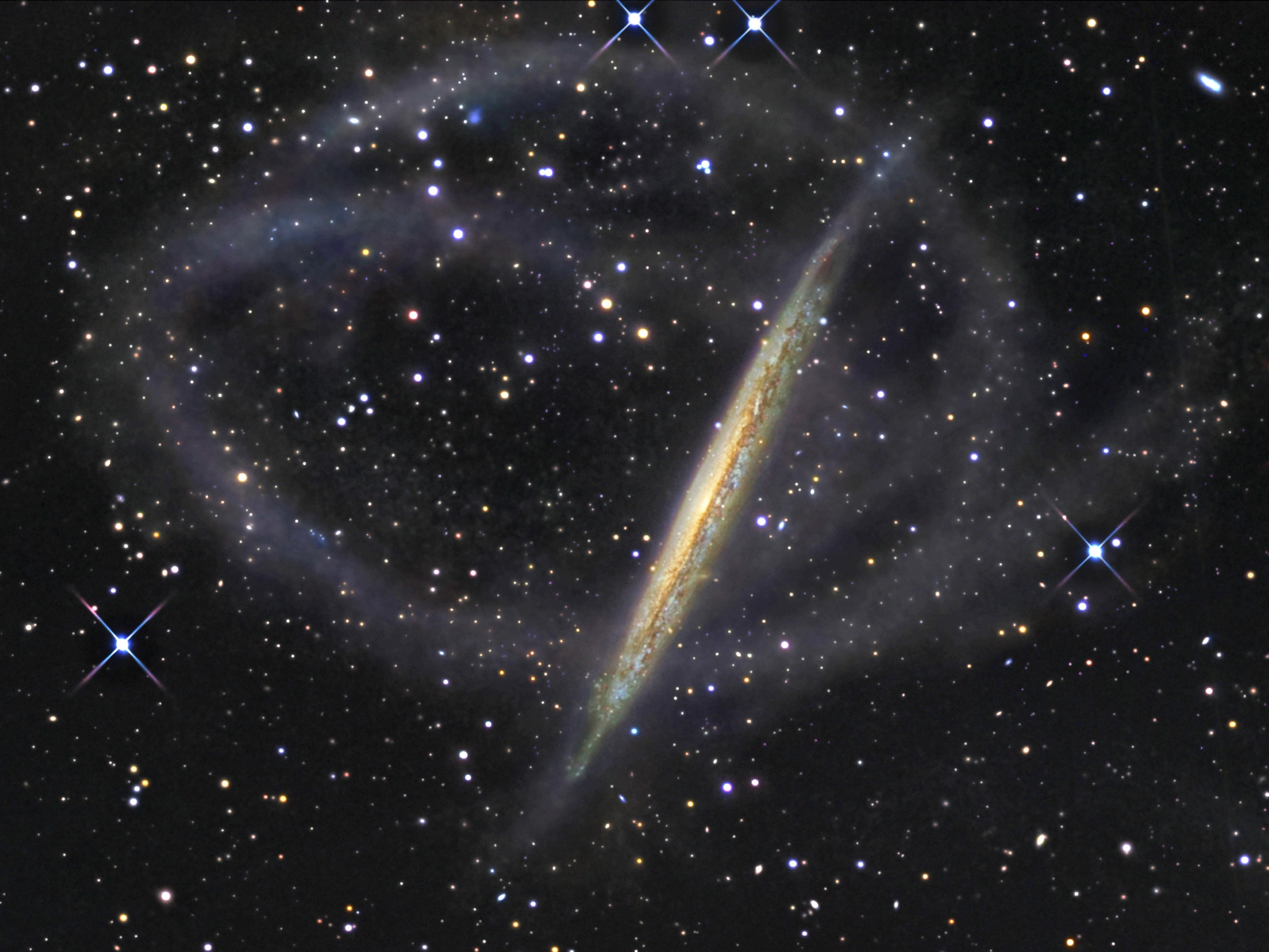
The galaxy NGC 5907 with its stellar streams

A stellar stream is an association of stars orbiting a galaxy taking the appearance of an elongated stream of stars. Stars that are part of stellar streams were often once part of a globular cluster or dwarf galaxy. However, their original system has now been torn apart and stretched out along its orbit by the tidal forces of the larger galaxy. Stellar streams are crucial for the understanding of galaxy interaction. They show the history of that galaxy and that interactions between galaxies are still happening in the modern Universe. The study of stellar streams were often limited to those that are local, orbiting around the Milky Way.

==== Globular cluster streams ====
Stellar streams that have originated from globular clusters are known as Globular cluster streams (GC streams). This seems to be a common occurrence with many stellar streams around the Milky Way galaxy originating from tidally dissolved globular clusters. This caused significant mass loss to the cluster drastically changing the properties and environment of the cluster. Astronomical observatories such as the Vera C. Rubin Observatory and the Nancy Grace Roman Space Telescope can have the potential to detect up to ~1000 globular cluster streams around the Milky Way.

These objects are important for study as they are able to trace low-mass dark matter subhalos being among the most sensitive tracers of them. The joint analysis of the entire population of the stream places strong constraints on how he mass and nature of these halos and this dark matter itself.

=== Known kinematic groups ===
Some nearby kinematic groups include:

- Local Association (Pleiades moving group)
- AB Doradus moving group
- Alpha Persei moving cluster
- Beta Pictoris moving group
- Castor moving group
- Corona Australis association
- Eta Chamaeleontis cluster
- Hercules-Lyra association
- Hercules stream
- Hyades Stream
- IC 2391 supercluster (Argus Association)
- Kapteyn group
- MBM 12 association
- TW Hydrae association
- Ursa Major Moving Group
- Wolf 630 moving group
- Zeta Herculis moving group
- Pisces-Eridanus stellar stream
- Tucana-Horologium association

== The sun's motion in the galaxy ==
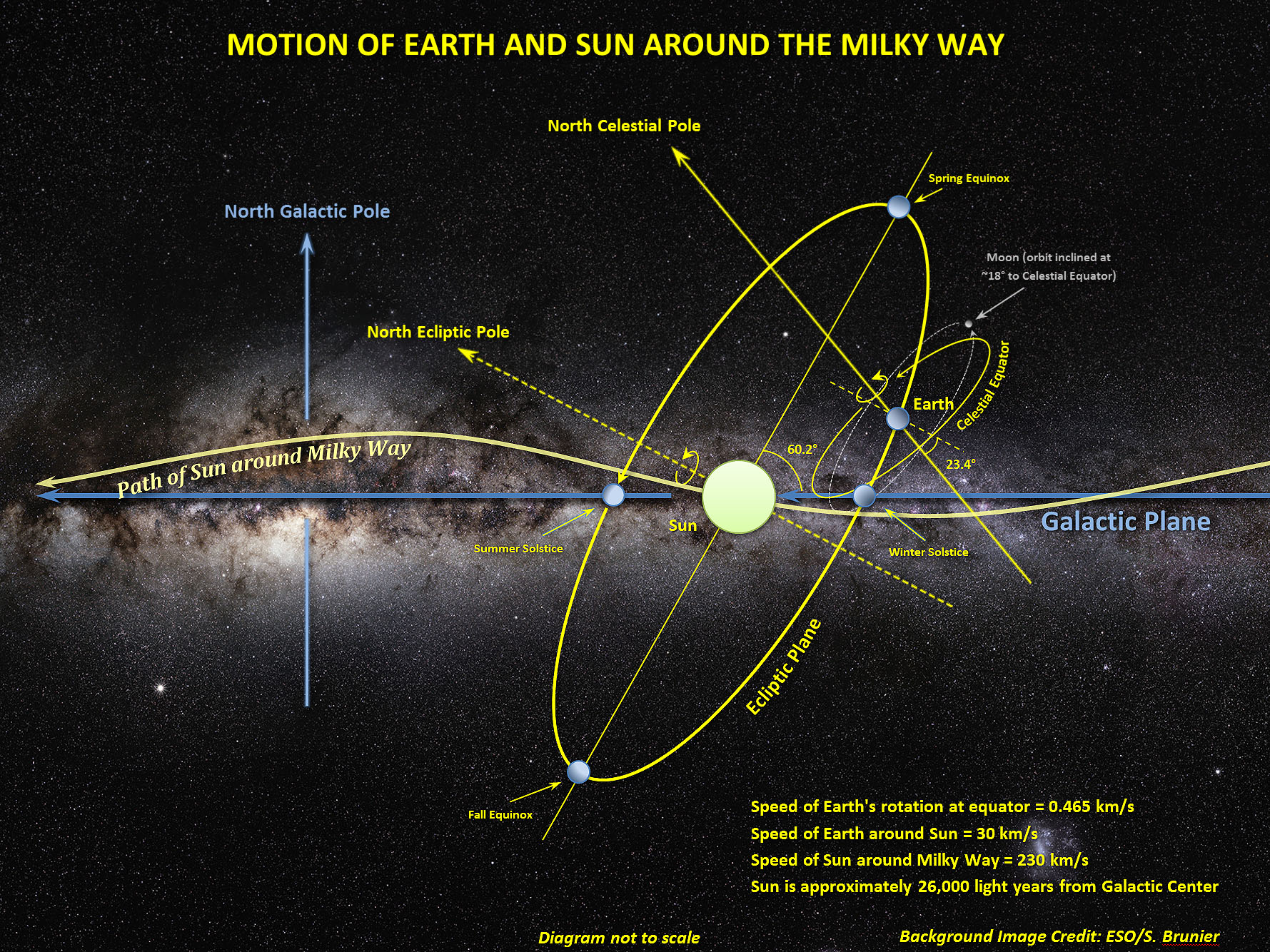
The general motion and orientation of the sun, with Earth and the Moon as its Solar System satellites

The sun, taking along the whole Solar System, orbits the galaxy's centre of mass at an average speed of 230 km/s (828,000 km/h), taking about 220–250 million Earth years to complete a revolution (a galactic year), having done so about 20 times since the sun's formation. The direction of the sun's motion, the Solar apex, is roughly in the direction of the star Vega. In the past the sun likely moved through the Orion–Eridanus Superbubble, before entering the Local Bubble.

The sun's idealised orbit around the Galactic Centre in an artist's top-down depiction of the current layout of the Milky Way

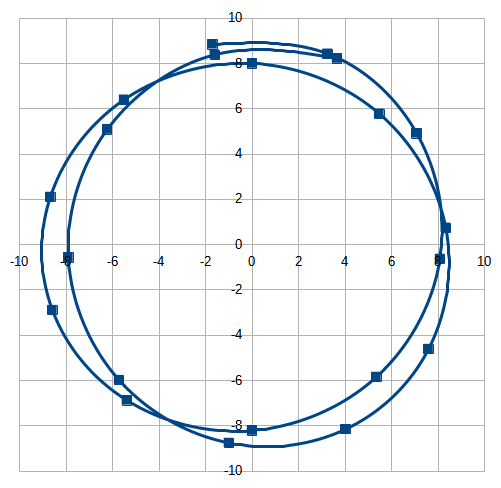
Path of sun around the Milky Way from 250 million BC to AD 250 million, according to a simple model, and assuming we are 8 kiloparsecs from the centre. The scales are in kiloparsecs. At present we are at (0, 8) and moving to the right. The points are spaced 25 million years apart. The Andromeda Galaxy is towards the upper right 765 kiloparsecs away.

A simple model of the motion of a star in the galaxy gives the galactic coordinates X, Y, and Z (rotating coordinates so that the centre of the galaxy is always in the X direction) as:

$$X(t)=X(0)+\frac{U(0)}\kappa\sin(\kappa t)+\frac{V(0)}{2B}(1-\cos(\kappa t))$$

$$Y(t)=Y(0)+2A\left(X(0)+\frac{V(0)}{2B}\right)t-\frac{\Omega_0}{B\kappa}V(0)\sin(\kappa t)+\frac{2\Omega_0}{\kappa^2}U(0)(1-\cos(\kappa t))$$

$$Z(t)=\frac{W(0)}\nu\sin(\nu t)+Z(0)\cos(\nu t)$$

where U, V, and W are the respective velocities with respect to the local standard of rest, A and B are the Oort constants, $\Omega_0=A-B$ is the angular velocity of galactic rotation for the local standard of rest, $\kappa=\sqrt{-4\Omega_0B}$ is the "epicyclic frequency", and ν is the vertical oscillation frequency. For the sun, the present values of U, V, and W used in the reference were $(U(0),V(0),W(0))=(10.00, 5.25, 7.17)$ km/s, although more recent estimates are $(11.1, 12.24, 7.25),$ and estimates for the other constants are A = 15.5 km/s/kpc, B = −12.2 km/s/kpc, κ = 37 km/s/kpc, and ν=74 km/s/kpc. We take X(0) and Y(0) to be zero and Z(0) is estimated to be 17 parsecs. This model implies that the sun circulates around a point that is itself going around the galaxy. The period of the sun's circulation around the point is $2\pi/\kappa$. which comes to 166 million years, shorter than the time it takes for the point to go around the galaxy. In the (X, Y) coordinates, the sun describes an ellipse around the point, whose length in the Y direction, using the more recent values of U, V, and W, is

$$2\times\sqrt{\left(\frac{2\Omega_0}{\kappa^2}U(0)\right)^2+\left(\frac{\Omega_0}{B\kappa}V(0)\right)^2}\approx 1760\text{ parsec}.$$

and whose width in the X direction is

$$2\times\sqrt{\left(\frac{U(0)}\kappa\right)^2+\left(\frac{V(0)}{2B}\right)^2}\approx 1170\text{ parsec}$$

(Compare this to the distance of the sun from the centre of the galaxy, around 7 or 8 kiloparsecs.) The ratio of length to width of this ellipse, the same for all stars in our neighborhood, is $2\Omega/\kappa\approx 1.50.$ The moving point is presently at

$$X=\frac{V(0)}{2B}=-502\text{ parsec}$$

$$Y=\frac{2\Omega_0}{\kappa^2}U(0)=455\text{ parsec}.$$

The oscillation in the Z direction takes the sun

$$\sqrt{\left(\frac{W(0)}\nu\right)^2+Z(0)^2}=99\text{ parsec}$$

"north" of the galactic plane and the same distance "south" of it, with a period of $2\pi/\nu$ or 83 million years, approximately 2.7 times per orbit. Although $2\pi/\Omega_0$ is 222 million years, the value of $\Omega$ at the point around which the sun circulates, assuming 8 kiloparsecs for the distance to the centre of the galaxy $R_0,$ is

$$\Omega\approx\Omega_0-\frac{2A}{R_0}\Delta X\approx 26\text{ km/s/kpc},$$

corresponding to around 240 million years (see Oort constants), and this is the time that the point takes to go once around the galaxy. Other stars with the same value of $X+V/(2B)$ have to take the same amount of time to go around the galaxy as the sun and thus remain in the same general vicinity as the sun.

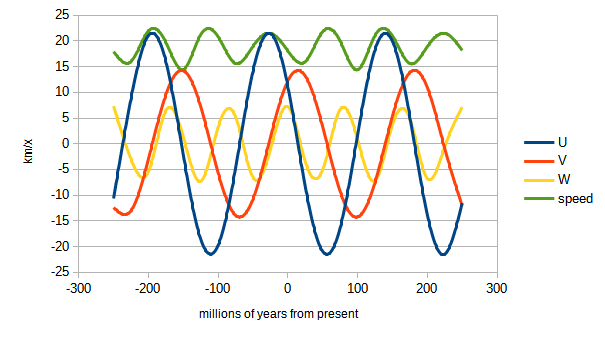
Velocity components and speed of sun relative to surrounding stars over 500 million years

By this model, the velocity components of the sun with respect to the local standard of rest is:

$$U(t)=\frac{dX(t)}{dt}=U(0)\cos(\kappa t)+\frac{\kappa V(0)}{2B}\sin(\kappa t))$$

$$V(t)=\frac{dY(t)}{dt}-2AX(t)=V(0)\cos(\kappa t)-\frac{2B}\kappa U(0)\sin(\kappa t)$$

$$W(t)=\frac{dZ(t)}{dt}=W(0)\cos(\nu t)-\nu Z(0)\sin(\nu t)$$

The speed

$$\sqrt{U(t)^2+V(t)^2+W(t)^2}$$

is thus a quasiperiodic function with values in the range $\sqrt{U(0)^2+\kappa^2V(0)^2/(2B)^2}$ (around 14 km/s) to $\sqrt{V(0)^2+(2B)^2U(0)^2/\kappa^2+ W(0)^2+\nu^2Z(0)^2}$ (around 23 km/s), with a present value around 18 km/s.

Note that this model does not take into consideration that the Oort "constants" and Ω actually decrease with distance from the centre of the galaxy.

The Sun's orbit around the Milky Way is perturbed due to the non-uniform mass distribution in Milky Way, such as that in and between the galactic spiral arms. It has been argued that the Sun's passage through the higher density spiral arms often coincides with mass extinctions on Earth, perhaps due to increased impact events. It takes the Solar System about 225–250 million years to complete one orbit through the Milky Way (a galactic year), so it is thought to have completed 20–25 orbits during the lifetime of the Sun. The orbital speed of the Solar System about the centre of the Milky Way is approximately 251 km/s (156 mi/s). At this speed, it takes around 1,190 years for the Solar System to travel a distance of 1 light-year, or 7 days to travel 1 AU.

== See also ==
- Astrometry
- Gaia (spacecraft)
- Hipparcos
- n-body problem
- Open cluster remnant
- List of nearby stellar associations and moving groups
- Stellar association
