= SDSS J090745.0+024507 =

Variable star in the constellation Hydra

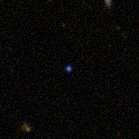
- SDSS image of SDSS J090745.0+024507 (blue dot in the center)

Observation data Epoch J2000 Equinox ICRS
- Constellation: Hydra
- Right ascension: 09^{h} 07^{m} 44.9925^{s}
- Declination: +02° 45′ 06.877″
- Apparent magnitude (V): 19.84

Characteristics
- Spectral type: B9 V
- Variable type: SPB

Astrometry
| Radial velocity (R_{v}) | +853 ± 12 km/s |
| Distance | 230000 ly (71000 pc) |

Details
| Temperature | 10,500 K |

Other designations
- SDSS J090744.99+024506.8

Database references
| SIMBAD | data |

SDSS J090744.99+024506.8 (SDSS 090745.0+024507) is a short-period variable star in the constellation Hydra. It has a Galactic rest-frame radial velocity of 709 km/s.

Its effective temperature is 10,500 K (corresponding to a spectral type of B9) and its age is estimated to be at most 350 million years. It has a heliocentric distance of 71 kpc. It was ejected from the centre of the galaxy less than 100 million years ago, which implies the existence of a population of young stars at the galactic centre less than 100 million years ago.

Christened by the astronomer Warren Brown as the "outcast star", it is the first discovered member of a class of objects named hypervelocity stars. It was discovered in 2005 at the MMT Observatory of the Center for Astrophysics | Harvard & Smithsonian (CfA), by astronomers Warren Brown, Margaret J. Geller, Scott J. Kenyon and Michael J. Kurtz.

== See also ==
- List of star extremes
- S5-HVS1 – another fast moving star
- US 708 – another fast moving star
