= Ursa Major Arc =

Arc of gas in the constellation Ursa Major

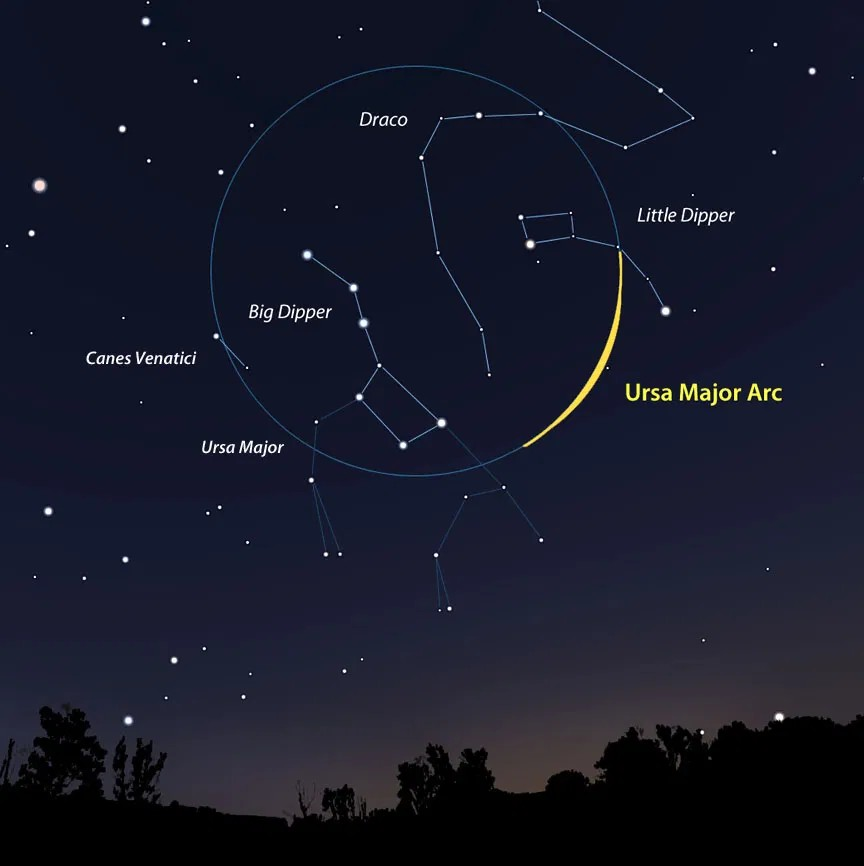
Ursa Major 30° long arc visualization with circle drawn for full 60° diameter

The Ursa Major Arc or UMa Arc is a faint arc of gas seen in the constellation of Ursa Major, about 60° diameter and 30° long. It exists as compressed, energized interstellar gas about 600 light years away and probably formed by supernova explosion about 100,000 years ago. It was discovered accidentally in images from the Galaxy Evolution Explorer, identified as ultraviolet emissions. It is too faint to be seen except with special equipment.

== See also ==
- Barnard's Loop
