= HVS 7 =

Hyper-velocity star in the constellation Leo

Observation data Epoch J2000 Equinox ICRS
- Constellation: Leo
- Right ascension: 11^{h} 33^{m} 12.125^{s}
- Declination: +01° 08′ 24.87″
- Apparent magnitude (V): 17.80

Characteristics
- Spectral type: sdB

Astrometry
Radial velocity (R_{v})	518 km/s
Proper motion (μ)	RA: -1 mas/yr Dec.: 1 mas/yr
Distance	180,000 ly (55,000 pc)

Details
Mass	3.7 M_{☉}
Radius	4.0 R_{☉}
Luminosity	300 L_{☉}
Surface gravity (log g)	3.8 cgs
Temperature	12,000 K
Rotational velocity (v sin i)	55 km/s
Age	150 Myr

Other designations
- SDSS J113312.12+010824.9, EPIC 201540171

Database references
SIMBAD	data

HVS 7 or hyper-velocity star 7, otherwise known as SDSS J113312.12+010824.9 is a rare star that has been accelerated to faster than our Milky Way Galaxy's escape velocity. In 2013 a team under N. Przybilla wrote that the star had a chemically peculiar photosphere, which masked its origins. The star was first cataloged during the Sloan Digital Sky Survey. It was identified as a hyper-velocity star in 2006.

The star has a chemically peculiar spectrum, roughly matching a B-type subdwarf. Stars in this region of the Hertzsprung–Russell diagram are expected to either be hot horizontal branch stars, low-mass helium-burning objects, or moderate mass hydrogen-burning stars slightly below the main sequence. The high rotational velocity of HVS 7 means it is likely to be a young star near the main sequence, around 150 million years old and 3.7 times the mass of the sun.
