= US 708 =

Hypervelocity O-type subdwarf in the halo of the Milky Way Galaxy

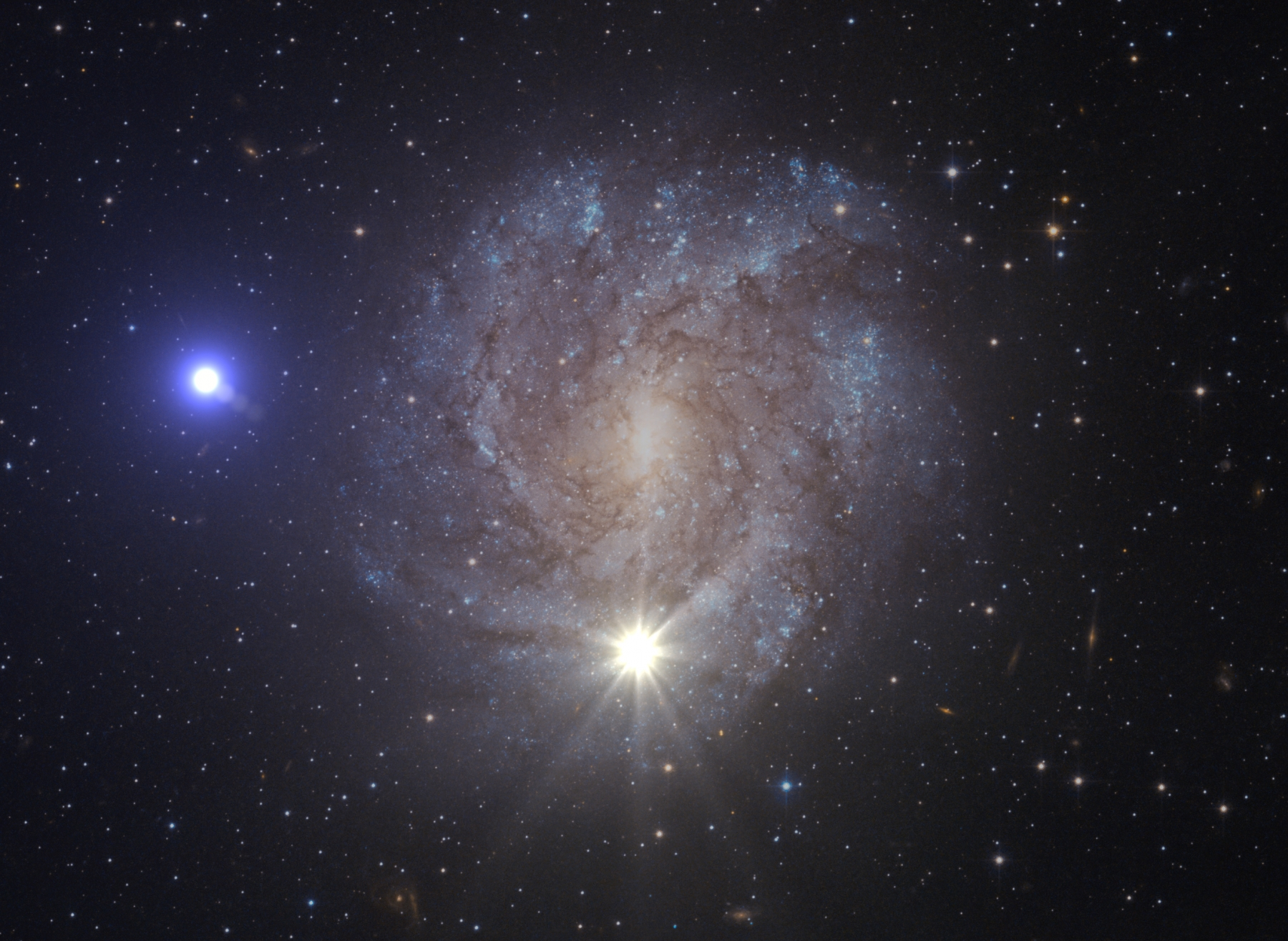
- Artist's concept of US 708 (the blue star on the left)

Observation data Epoch J2000 Equinox ICRS
- Constellation: Ursa Major
- Right ascension: 09^{h} 33^{m} 20.865^{s}
- Declination: +44° 17′ 05.52″
- Apparent magnitude (V): 18.8

Characteristics
- Spectral type: sdOHe

Astrometry
Radial velocity (R_{v})	708.0 ± 15.0 km/s
Proper motion (μ)	RA: −7.33 ± 0.58 mas/yr Dec.: 2.28 ± 0.55 mas/yr
Distance	60,300 ± 8,500 ly (18,500 ± 2,600 pc)

Details
Surface gravity (log g)	5.23 ± 0.12 cgs
Temperature	44561 ± 675 K

Other designations
- SDSS J093320.86+441705.4

Database references
SIMBAD	data

US 708 is a hyper-velocity class O subdwarf in Ursa Major, in the halo of the Milky Way Galaxy. One of the fastest-moving stars in the galaxy, the star was first surveyed in 1982.

== Discovery ==
US 708 was first discovered in 1982 by Peter Usher and colleagues of Pennsylvania State University as a faint blue object in the Milky Way halo. Sloan Digital Sky Survey measured the star again in 2005.

== Research ==
In 2015, Stephan Geier of the European Southern Observatory led a team that reported in Science that the velocity of the star was 1,200 km/s (4,300,000 km/h; 2,700,000 mph), the highest ever recorded in the galaxy at that time. The star's high velocity was originally suspected to be caused by the massive black hole at the center of the galaxy. But now it is found out that the star must have crossed the galactic disk about 14 million years ago and thus it did not come from the center of the galaxy; hence the speed now possessed by the star may not be attributed to the black hole. However, closer study suggested it had been one element of a pair of close binary stars.

Its companion had already entered its white dwarf stage when US 708 entered its red giant phase. Their respective orbits changed as its companion took gas from the outer layers of US 708. Then its companion acquired enough mass to go supernova, which triggered US 708 being flung away at its high velocity, not by the black hole at the center of our galaxy. The team behind the new observations suggests that it was orbiting a white dwarf roughly the mass of the Sun with an orbital period of less than 10 minutes.

== Structure ==
The star is a high speed rotating, dense helium star which is supposed to be formed by the interaction of a companion star nearby. These stars are composed of helium, which is the remnant of a massive star which had lost its envelope of hydrogen. Geier's team describe the star as the "fastest unbound star in the galaxy" and employed the Echellette Spectrograph and Imager attached to the 10 meter Keck II telescope in Hawaii. Its velocity exceeds the escape velocity of our galaxy.

== See also ==
- List of star extremes
- S5-HVS1 – fastest moving star as of November 2019
