= HD 49798 =

Binary star system in the constellation Puppis

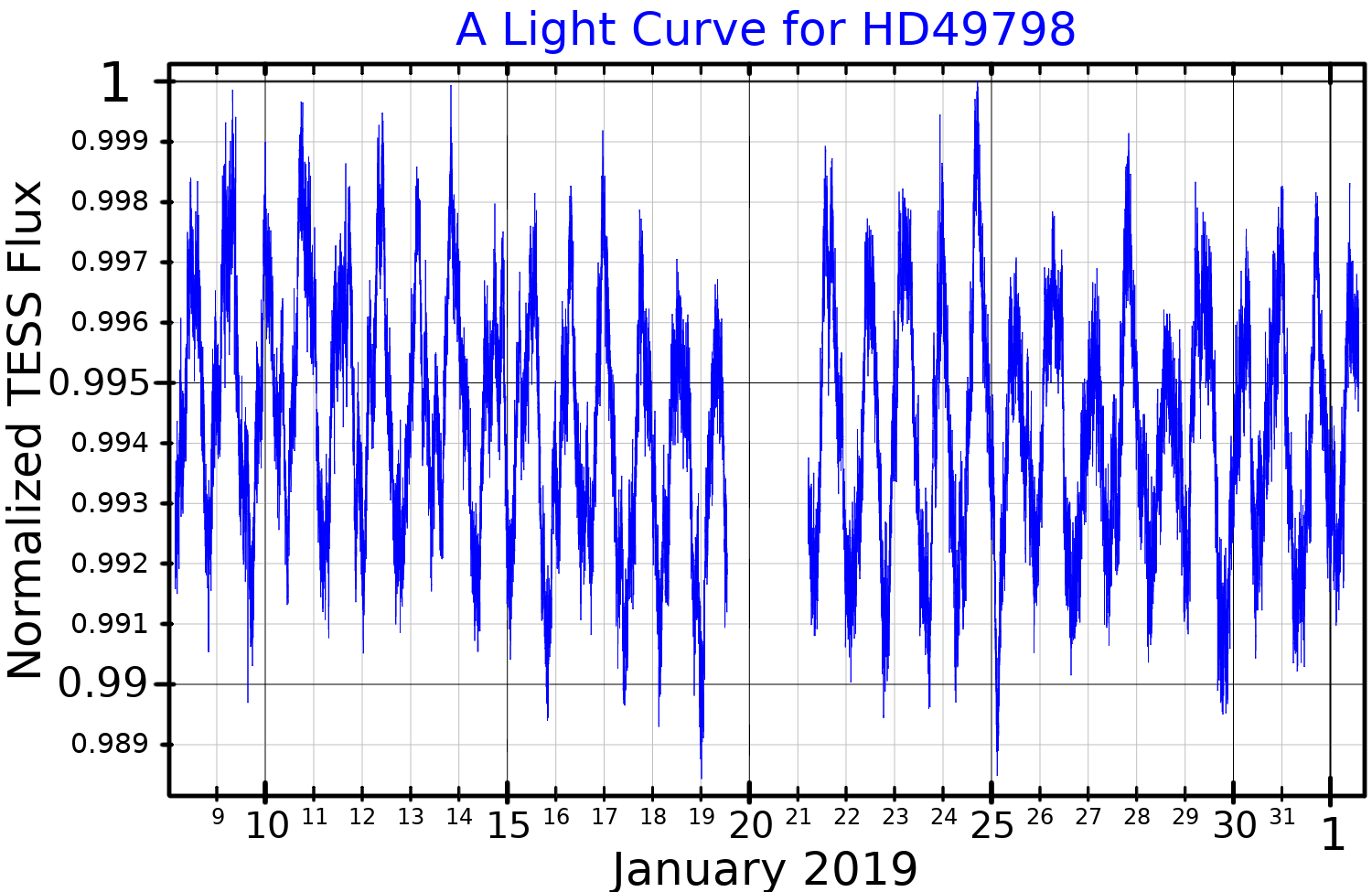
- A light curve for HD 49798, plotted from TESS data

Observation data Epoch J2000 Equinox ICRS
- Constellation: Puppis
- Right ascension: 06^{h} 48^{m} 04.70015^{s}
- Declination: −44° 18′ 58.4360″
- Apparent magnitude (V): 8.287

Characteristics
- Spectral type: sdO6p + WD
- U−B color index: −1.259
- B−V color index: −0.270
- Variable type: HMXB

Astrometry
Radial velocity (R_{v})	+12.10 km/s
Proper motion (μ)	RA: −4.162 mas/yr Dec.: +5.926 mas/yr
Parallax (π)	1.9196±0.0501 mas
Distance	1,700±46 ly (521±14 pc)

Orbit
Period (P)	1.547666(6) d
Semi-major axis (a)	2,891,000 ± 15,000 kilometres (0.01933 ± 0.00010 AU)
Eccentricity (e)	0.0
Inclination (i)	84.5±0.7°

Details

sdO5.5
Mass	1.41±0.02 M_{☉}
Radius	1.08±0.06 R_{☉}
Luminosity	3,943 L_{☉}
Surface gravity (log g)	4.25 cgs
Temperature	47,500 K

WD
Mass	1.220±0.008 M_{☉}
Radius	3,580 km
Temperature	225,000 K
Rotation	13.184246634(7) s

Other designations
- AAVSO 0645-44, CD−44°2920, HD 49798, HIP 32602, SAO 218207

Database references
SIMBAD	data

HD 49798 is a binary star in the constellation Puppis about 521 ± 14 parsecs (1,699 ± 46 ly) from Earth. It has an apparent magnitude of 8.3, making it one of the brightest known O class subdwarf stars.

HD 49798 was discovered in 1964 to be a rare hydrogen-deficient O class subdwarf, and was the brightest known at the time. This was identified as a binary star, but the companion could not be detected visually or spectroscopically.

The X-ray source RX J0648.0-4418 was discovered close to HD 49798's location in the sky. Only the space telescope XMM-Newton was able to identify the source. It is a white dwarf with about 1.3 solar masses, in orbit about HD 49798 and rotating once every 13 seconds; this rotation is speeding up by 72.0±0.6 ns per year. This is detected from the 13-second X-ray pulse, which results from the stellar wind accreting onto the compact object. It has been proposed that the white dwarf is surrounded by a debris disk. In this model, the material of the disk would be funneled onto the poles of the dwarf via the magnetic field, which would explain the observed X-ray pulses. This system is considered a likely candidate to explode as a type Ia supernova within a few tens of thousands of years.
