= S5-HVS1 =

Star in the constellation Grus

Observation data Epoch J2000.0 Equinox ICRS
- Constellation: Grus
- Right ascension: 22^{h} 54^{m} 51.62 ^{s}
- Declination: −51° 11′ 44.2″
Distance	8629+303 −293 pc

Other designations
- S5-HVS1, HE 2251-5127, 2MASS J22545163-5111440, Gaia DR2 6513109241989477504, Gaia DR3 6513109241989477504

Database references
SIMBAD	data

S5-HVS1 is an A-type main-sequence star notable as the fastest one detected as of November 2019, and has been determined to be traveling with a peculiar velocity of 1,755 km/s (3,930,000 mph), almost 0.6% of the speed of light. The star is in the southern constellation Grus, and about 29,000 light-years from Earth. According to astronomers, S5-HVS1 was ejected from the Milky Way galaxy after interacting with Sagittarius A*, the supermassive black hole at the center of the galaxy. It is possible that it was originally part of a binary system that was tidally disrupted by the supermassive black hole, causing it to be ejected. If this is the case, that it was flung out of the galaxy by the central black hole, it is then the first known example of a star that has undergone the Hills mechanism.

The star's discovery has been credited to Sergey Koposov, assistant professor of physics at Carnegie Mellon University, as part of the Southern Stellar Stream Spectroscopic Survey (S5). The designation HVS1 refers to hypervelocity stars (HVS).

== See also ==
- Intergalactic star
- List of star extremes
- SDSS J090745.0+024507 – another fast moving star
- US 708 – another fast moving star
