= 53 Arietis =

Star in the constellation Aries

Observation data Epoch J2000 Equinox ICRS
- Constellation: Aries
- Right ascension: 03^{h} 07^{m} 25.67315^{s}
- Declination: +17° 52′ 47.9696″
- Apparent magnitude (V): 6.10

Characteristics
- Evolutionary stage: main sequence
- Spectral type: B1.5 V
- U−B color index: +0.80
- B−V color index: −0.12
- Variable type: β Cep

Astrometry
Radial velocity (R_{v})	+21.2 km/s
Proper motion (μ)	RA: −23.733 mas/yr Dec.: +8.080 mas/yr
Parallax (π)	3.1874±0.0630 mas
Distance	1,020 ± 20 ly (314 ± 6 pc)

Details
Mass	7.5±0.2 M_{☉}
Radius	4.2 R_{☉}
Luminosity	1,962 L_{☉}
Surface gravity (log g)	3.99 cgs
Temperature	19,065 K
Metallicity [Fe/H]	−0.18 dex
Rotational velocity (v sin i)	5 km/s

Other designations
- UW Arietis, BD+17°493, HD 19374, HIP 14514, HR 938, SAO 93284.

Database references
SIMBAD	data

53 Arietis (abbreviated 53 Ari) is a variable star in the northern constellation of Aries. 53 Arietis is the Flamsteed designation; it also bears the variable star designation UW Arietis. It is a B-type main sequence star with a stellar classification of B1.5 V and mean apparent magnitude of 6.10, which is near the lower limit for naked eye visibility. Based upon an annual parallax shift of 3.2 mas, the estimated distance to this star is roughly 1,020 light-years (314 parsecs).

The claimed variability of 53 Arietis has not been confirmed. It is a runaway star with a peculiar velocity of 48.1 km/s relative to its neighbors. The star was ejected from the Orion Nebula some 4–5 million years ago, possibly when an orbiting companion exploded as a supernova. Barnard's Loop is believed to be the remnant of the supernova that launched the star.
