= List of star extremes =

A star is a massive luminous spheroid astronomical object made of plasma that is held together by its own gravity. Stars exhibit great diversity in their properties (such as mass, volume, velocity, stage in stellar evolution, and distance from Earth) and some of the outliers are so disproportionate in comparison with the general population that they are considered extreme. This is a list of such stars.

Records that are regarded as authoritative and unlikely to change at any given point are recorded on a white background, while those that could change with new information and/or discoveries are recorded on a grey background.

== Age and distance ==
Title	Object	Date	Data	Comments	Notes	Refs	See more
Nearest star	Sun	3rd century BC	1 AU	Our local star's distance was first determined in the 3rd century BC by Aristarchus of Samos.	Reported for reference		
Second-nearest star	Proxima Centauri	1915	1.30 pc	Also called Alpha Centauri C, it is the outlying star in a trinary star system that includes Alpha Centauri A (Rigil Kentaurus) and Alpha Centauri B (Toliman). This is currently the nearest known neighbouring star to our own Sun. This star was discovered in 1915, and its parallax was determined at the time, when enough observations were established.	(Note: Other than the Sun)		List of nearest stars
Most distant individually seen star	WHL0137-LS (Earendel)	2022	z= 6.2 ± 0.1 12.9 Gly	Most likely a star cluster.			List of most distant stars
Most distant galaxy	Stars in MoM-z14	2025	z= 14.44 13.53 Gly (light travel distance)				List of the most distant astronomical objects
Most distant star gravitationally bound to Milky Way galaxy	ULAS J0015+01	2014	900,000 light-years	Located in the Milky Way's extreme outer halo, far beyond the galactic disc.			
Oldest star	HD 140283	2025	14.2±0.4 billion years				List of oldest stars
Youngest	Stars are being formed constantly in the universe so it is impossible to tell which star is the youngest. For information on the properties of newly formed stars, see Protostar, Young stellar object and Star formation.						

Nearest stars by type
Title	Object	Date	Data	Comments	Notes	Refs	See more
Nearest extrasolar star	Proxima Centauri (Alpha Centauri C)	1915	1.30 parsecs (4.2 ly)	Before Proxima, the title had been held by Alpha Centauri A & B.	(Note: A normal star is a star that is past its protostar period, in its main fusion period, before becoming a degenerate star, black hole, or post-stellar nebula, and is not a failed star (brown dwarf).)		
Nearest red dwarf	Proxima Centauri (Alpha Centauri C)	1915	1.30 parsecs (4.2 ly)	Before Proxima, the title had been held by Barnard's Star.			
Nearest degenerate star	Sirius B	1852	8.6 light-years (2.6 pc)	This is also the nearest white dwarf.	(Note: Not including stellar-mass black holes or exotic stars)		
Nearest subdwarf	Kapteyn's Star	1898	12.83 light-years (3.93 pc)	Kapteyn's Star is either a sdM1 subdwarf or a M1.5V main-sequence star. WISEA 1810−1010 is the nearest undisputed subdwarf, at 29.03 light-years (8.90 pc).			
Nearest subgiant	Procyon		11.5 light-years (3.5 pc)	All stars closer to the Sun are main sequence, degenerate stars or brown dwarfs.			
Nearest giant star	Pollux		33.8 light-years (10.4 pc)				List of nearest giant stars
Nearest bright giant star	ρ Puppis		63.5 light-years (19.5 pc)				
Nearest supergiant	Canopus		309 light-years (95 pc)	While it is frequently described as a yellow supergiant, especially in evolutionary terms, it is classified as a bright giant based on spectrum.			List of nearest supergiants
Nearest carbon star	CW Leonis		310 light-years (95 pc)				
Nearest M-type star	Proxima Centauri	1915	1.30 parsecs (4.2 ly)				List of nearest M-type stars
Nearest K-type star	Alpha Centauri B		1.33 parsecs (4.3 ly)				List of nearest K-type stars
Nearest G-type star	Sun		1 AU				List of nearest G-type stars
Nearest F-type star	Procyon		11.46 light-years (3.51 pc)				List of nearest F-type stars
Nearest A-type star	Sirius		8.6 light-years (2.6 pc)				List of nearest A-type stars
Nearest B-type star	Regulus		79.3 light-years (24.3 pc)				List of nearest B-type stars
Nearest O-type star	Zeta Ophiuchi		420 light-years (130 pc)				List of nearest O-type stars
Nearest Wolf–Rayet star	Gamma Velorum		1,080 light-years (330 pc)				
Nearest neutron star	RX J1856.35-3754	2000	400 light-years (120 pc)				
Nearest white dwarf	Sirius B	1852	8.6 light-years (2.6 pc)	Sirius B is also the second white dwarf discovered, after 40 Eridani B.			
Nearest brown dwarf	Luhman 16	2013	6.5 light-years (2.0 pc)	This is a pair of brown dwarfs in a binary system, with no other stars.			
Nearest luminous blue variable	P Cygni		5,251 light-years (1,610 pc)				

== Brightness and power ==
Title	Object	Date	Data	Comments	Notes	Refs	See more
Brightest star from the Earth: Apparent magnitude	Sun	prehistoric	m=−26.74		Reported for reference (Note: By visual magnitude (m)) (Note: This is the appearance in the sky from Earth.)		
Brightest star other than the Sun	Sirius (Alpha Canis Majoris)	prehistoric	m= −1.46	See also: Historical brightest stars	(Note: This does not include brightest stars due to outbursts)		List of brightest stars
Dimmest star from the Earth	MMS 6-main	2009	m= 15,000	This is a very young protostar in the Orion molecular cloud.			
Brightest star in a transient event	Progenitor of SN 1006	1006	m= −7.5	This was a supernova, and its remnant (SNR) is catalogued as PKS 1459-41.			
Most luminous star	R136a1	2010	L= 7,240,000 L_{Sun}				List of most luminous stars
Least luminous star	2MASS J0523−1403	2013	L=0.000126L_{Sun}		(Note: Energetic here is the total electromagnetic energy emitted by a star in all wavelengths.)		
Most luminous star in a transient event	Progenitor of GRB 080916C	2008	V=−40	The star exploded in a gamma-ray burst with the total energy equal to 9,000 supernovae.	(Note: Luminosity here represents how bright a star is if all stars were equally far away, in visible light.)		List of gamma-ray bursts
Most energetic star	R136a1	2010	B=-12.5				List of most luminous stars
Most energetic star in a transient event	Progenitor of GRB 080916C	2008					
Hottest star	WR 102		T= 200,000 K (200,000 °C; 360,000 °F)				List of hottest stars
Coolest star	S Cassiopeiae		T= 1,800 K (1,530 °C; 2,780 °F)				List of coolest stars

Title	Object	Date	Data	Comments	Notes	Refs	See more
Hottest white dwarf	RX J0439.8-6809	2015	250,000 K (450,000 °F)				
Hottest neutron star	PSR B0943+10		3,100,000 K (5,580,000 °F)	Blackbody temperature of a small emitting area at the poles			
Hottest brown dwarf	ZTF J1406+1222 B	2022	10,462 K (10,189 °C; 18,372 °F)				
Coolest neutron star							
Coolest white dwarf	PSR J2222−0137 B	2014	<3,000 K (2,730 °C; 4,940 °F)				
Coolest brown dwarf	WISE 0855−0714	2014	276 K (3 °C; 37 °F)				List of coolest stars

== Size and mass ==
Title	Object	Date	Data	Comments	Notes	Refs	See more
Largest apparent size star	Sun	prehistoric (3rd century BC)	31.6′ – 32.7′	The apparent size of the Sun was first measured by Eratosthenes in the 3rd century BC, who was the second person to measure the distance to the Sun. However, Thales of Miletus provided a measurement for the real size of the Sun in the 6th century BC, as 1/720 the great circle of the Sun (the orbit of the Earth).	Reported for reference		
Largest extrasolar apparent size star	R Doradus	1997	0.057"	This replaced Betelgeuse as the largest, Betelgeuse having been the first star other than the Sun to have its apparent size measured.			
Smallest apparent size star	Most distant stars to Earth						
Largest star	Stephenson 2 DFK 1 (St2-18)	2026	1,840+300 −370 R_{☉}			(Note: Calculated, using the Stefan-Boltzmann law and the star's effective temperature and luminosity, with respect to the solar nominal effective temperature of 5,772 K: $$\sqrt{\biggl(\frac{5,772}{3,200}\biggr)^4 \cdot 321,000} = 1,840\ R_\odot.$$)	List of largest stars
Smallest star	SGR J1935+2154	2024	4.35+1.95 −1.35 km (6.25×10^{−6} R_{☉})				List of smallest stars
Smallest normal star	BE Ursae Majoris A	2008	0.046±0.002 R_{☉}				List of smallest stars
Most massive star	R136a1	2025	291±46 M_{☉}	This exceeds the predicted limit of 150 M_{☉}, previously believed to be the limit of stellar mass, according to the leading star formation theories. R136a1 considered the most massive known by the scientific community.			List of most massive stars
Least massive star	2MASS J0523−1403	2021	0.07 M_{☉}				List of least massive stars

Most massive stars by type
Title	Object	Date	Data	Comments	Notes	Refs	See more
Most massive brown dwarf	Lup 607	2021	105 M_{Jupiter}	This is at the limit between brown dwarfs and red dwarfs.			
Most massive degenerate star	The most massive type of degenerate star is the neutron star. See Most massive neutron star for this recordholder.						
Most massive neutron star	PSR J0740+6620	2019	2.14 M_{☉}	Several candidates exist which have a higher mass; however, their mass has been measured by less precise methods and as such their mass value is regarded as less certain.			List of most massive neutron stars
Most massive neutron star (disputed)	PSR J1748-2021B	2015	2.548 M_{☉}				List of most massive neutron stars
Most massive white dwarf	RE J0317-853/ZTF J1901+1458	1998/2020	1.35 M_{Sun}				

Least massive stars by type
Title	Object	Date	Data	Comments	Notes	Refs	See more
Least massive neutron star	HESS J1731-347	2022	0.77 M_{☉}				
Least massive white dwarf	NLTT 11748	2021	0.13–0.16 M_{☉}				
Least massive brown dwarf	(unnamed)	2023	3 – 4 M_{J}	Located in the star cluster IC 348			Sub-brown dwarf

== Motion ==
Title	Object	Date	Data	Comments	Notes	Refs	See more
Highest proper motion	Barnard's Star		10.3 "/yr	This is also the fourth closest star to the Solar System.			
Lowest proper motion	N/A	N/A	~0 "/yr	Billions of stars on the other end of the galaxy			
Highest radial velocity							
Lowest radial velocity	EY Aquarii	2013	-870 km/s	Mira variable	(Note: Stars with particularly high radial velocities are usually erroneously recorded, so all large values should be taken with a grain of salt.)		
Highest peculiar motion							
Lowest peculiar motion							
Highest rotational speed of a normal star	VFTS 102	2013	600 km/s				
Lowest rotational speed							
Fastest velocity of a star	S5-HVS1	2019	1,755 km/s				

== Star systems ==
Title	Object	Date	Data	Comments	Notes	Refs	See more
Least stars in a star system	There are many single star systems.						
Most stars in a star system	QZ Carinae		Nonuple star system	System contains at least nine stars.	(Note: The allowable distance between components of a star system is debated.)		
Stars in the closest orbit around one another	There are many stars that are in contact binary systems (where two or more stars are in physical contact with each other).						
Stars in the most distant orbit around one another	Regulus/SDSS J1007+1930	2024	~3.9 parsecs (13 ly)				
Nearest multiple star system	Alpha Centauri	1839	1.30 parsecs (4.2 ly)	This was one of the first three stars to have its distance measured.			
Nearest solitary star	Barnard's Star	1916	1.83 parsecs (6.0 ly)				
Nearest binary star system	Luhman 16	2013	1.998 parsecs (6.52 ly)	Brown dwarf binary system. The nearest non-brown dwarf binary is Sirius, and the nearest composed entirely of main-sequence stars is Luyten 726-8.			
Nearest trinary star system	Alpha Centauri	1839	1.38 parsecs (4.5 ly)	Also nearest multiple star system, and nearest star system of any type			
Nearest quaternary star system	Gliese 570		5.88 parsecs (19.2 ly)	K4 star orbited by a pair of M stars, all orbited by a T7 brown dwarf			
Nearest quintenary star system	V1054 Ophiuchi		6.46 parsecs (21.1 ly)	M3 star orbited by a pair of pair of M4 stars, together orbited by an M3.5 star, all orbited by an M7 star			
Nearest sextenary star system	Castor	1718	15.6 parsecs (51 ly)	A1 star orbited by a red dwarf, both orbited by another A star orbited by a red dwarf, all orbited by two red dwarfs orbiting each other			
Nearest septenary star system	Acrux	2026	107 parsecs (350 ly)	A B0.5IV star orbited by an unknown-type star, both orbited by a pair of stars with combined spectrum B1V, all orbited by a B5V + ? pair, together orbited by a M0V star			

== See also ==
- Angular diameter
- Compact object
- Historical brightest stars
- List of brightest stars
- Lists of constellations
- IAU designated constellations by area
- List of exoplanet extremes
- List of extremes in the sky
- List of largest stars
- List of most luminous stars
- List of nearest bright stars
- List of nearest galaxies
- List of nearest stars
- Lists of stars
- Lists of stars by constellation
- Peculiar velocity
- Proper motion
- Radial velocity
- Rotational frequency
- Star
- Star system
