= Subdwarf O star =

Subdwarf star with spectral type O

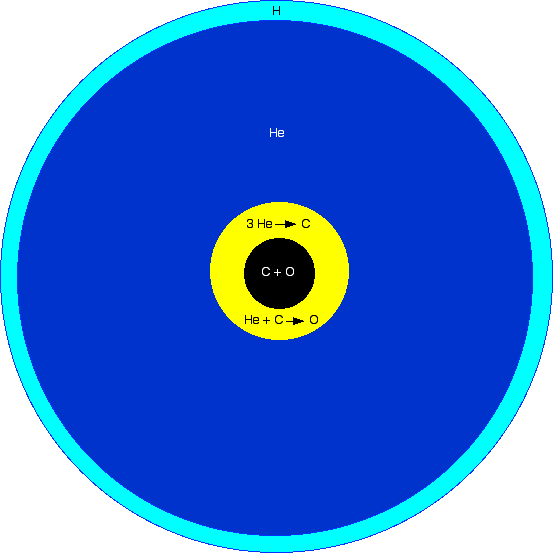
Schematic cross-section of an O-type subdwarf

A subdwarf O star (sdO) is a type of hot, but low-mass star. O-type subdwarfs are much dimmer than regular O-type main-sequence stars, but with a brightness about 10 to 100 times that of the Sun, and have a mass approximately half that of the Sun. Their temperature ranges from 40,000 to 100,000 K. Ionized helium is prominent in their spectra. Their surface gravity (typically given as the gravity's logarithm), log g is usually between 4.0 and 6.5. Many sdO stars are moving at high velocity through the Milky Way and are found at high galactic latitudes.

== Structure ==
The structure of a subdwarf O star is believed to be a carbon and oxygen core surrounded by a helium burning shell. The spectrum shows that the content is from 50 to 100% helium.

== History ==
In the early 1970s Greenstein and Sargent measured temperatures and gravity strengths and were able to plot their correct position on the Hertzsprung–Russell diagram. The Palomar–Green survey, Hamburg surveys, Sloan Digital Sky Survey and Supernova Ia Progenitor Survey (ESO-SPY) have documented many of these stars.

== Occurrence ==
Subdwarf O stars are only a third as common as subdwarf B stars.

== Spectrum ==
There is actually a variety of spectra from the sdO stars. They can be grouped into those with strong helium lines, termed He-sdO, and those with stronger hydrogen lines, H strong sdO. The He-sdO are fairly rare. Usually nitrogen is enriched and carbon depleted. However, there are variations with enhancement in concentration of even numbered elements such as carbon, oxygen, neon, silicon, magnesium or iron.

== Examples ==
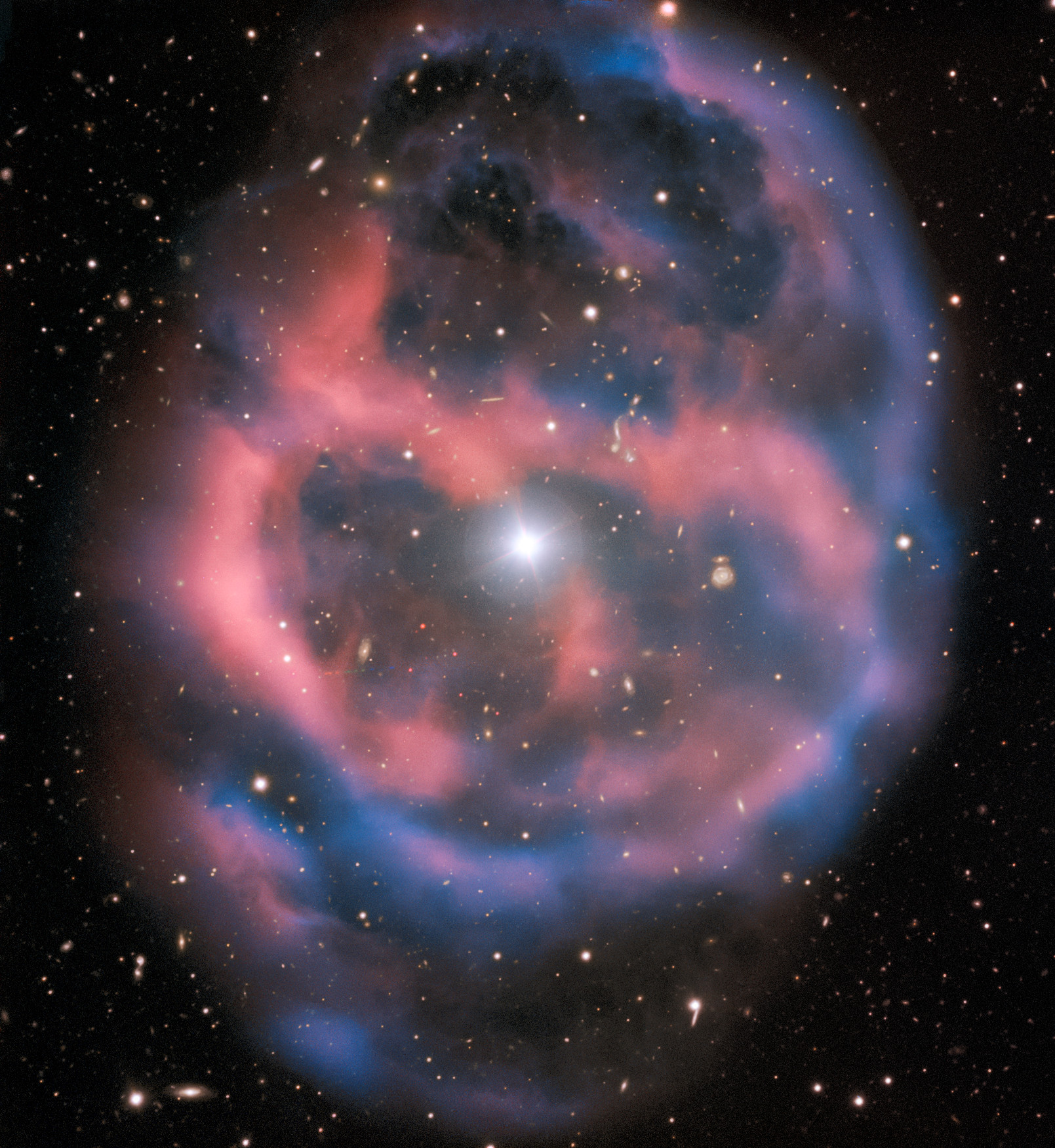
Planetary nebula Abell 36, the remains of a dead giant star leaving behind a subdwarf O star

- HD 128220 was studied by Corrado Bartolini
- HIP 52181 pulsates with a frequency of 1.04 milliHertz.
- HD 49798 is a carbon poor X-ray binary at 830pc.
- US 708 is a hypervelocity star that exceeds the escape velocity of the Milky Way.

== Life cycle ==
They can be plotted on the Hertzsprung–Russell diagram. They are from two stages in the stellar lifecycle, post–asymptotic giant branch (the luminous sdO), and post–extended horizontal branch compact sdO. The post-AGB stars are expected to be found in planetary nebulas, but only four of the sdO stars are known to be like this. The compact sdOs would be descendants of the B-type subdwarfs. However, statistics do not match sdB. An alternate theory is that sdOs have been formed by coalescing two white dwarfs. This could happen from a close binary that decays due to gravitational waves.
