= Orion–Eridanus Superbubble =

Structure in the Milky Way Galaxy

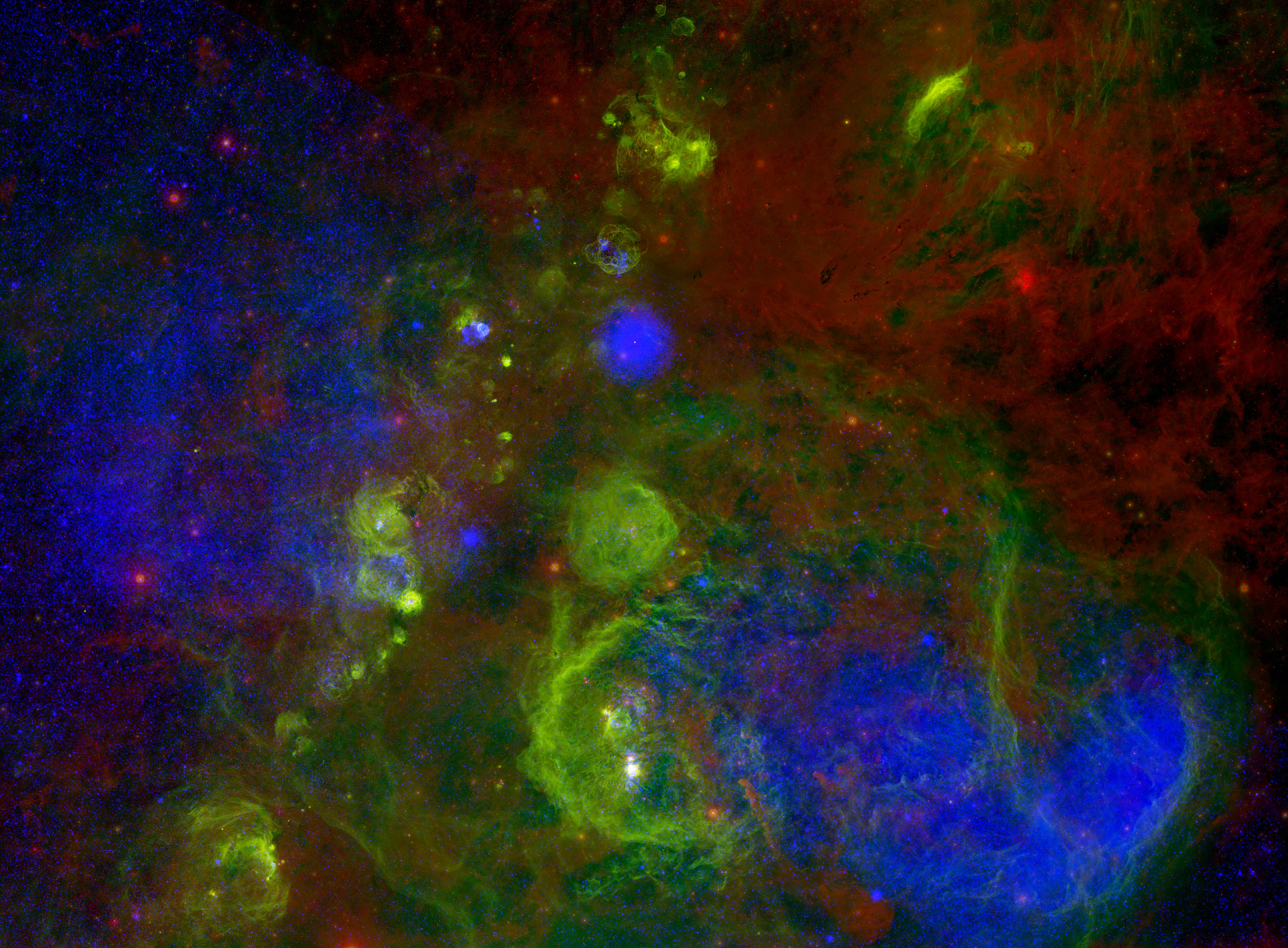
Orion-Eridanus Superbubble in Hα (without continuum; mapped to green), visual continuum (star-reduced and without Hα; mapped to red) and X-rays ((0.2-2.3 keV; mapped to blue). Optical data are from the Northern Sky Narrowband Survey, and X-ray data are from the eROSITA-DE DR1 of the western Galactic hemisphere. X-ray emissions (blue) are visible only through the voids of the molecular clouds (red). HII regions appear green.

The Orion–Eridanus Superbubble is a superbubble located in the constellations Orion and Eridanus. The region is formed from overlapping supernova remnants that were suspected to be associated with the Orion OB1 stellar association. The bubble is approximately 1200 ly across. It is the nearest superbubble to the Local Bubble containing the Sun, with the respective shock fronts being about 500 ly apart.

The Orion–Eridanus Superbubble is formed by the stellar wind of tens of massive stars and 10–20 supernovae. The superbubble likely formed from the Orion blue stream, which is composed of massive stars in front of the Orion Molecular Cloud Complex. The Orion blue stream begins at around 150 parsec and extends towards Orion OB1 at around 300 parsec. The stream could however include the Bellatrix cluster, which is around 80 parsec distant.

The structure was discovered from 21 cm radio observations by Carl Heiles and interstellar optical emission line observations by Reynolds and Ogden in the 1970s. The western part of the Orion–Eridanus Superbubble is visible in X-ray images and is therefore also referred to as the Eridanus Soft X-ray Enhancement. In the eastern part, these wavelengths are obscured by molecular clouds, making it impossible to determine the morphology from X-rays alone (see also the anti-correlation between the reddish molecular clouds and the blue X-ray emission in the image above).

Older works consider Barnard's Loop to be either the nearest or the most distant edge of the Orion–Eridanus Superbubble, assuming that the λ Orionis Nebula lies outside. More recent studies suggest that the superbubble extends to the Galactic plane and that both Barnard's Loop and the λ Orionis Nebula lie inside. The exact morphology and orientation in space remain uncertain.

The Sun might have passed through the Orion–Eridanus Superbubble before it passed through the Local Bubble. This could explain an older peak of iron-60 found in deep sea sediments.

== Gallery ==
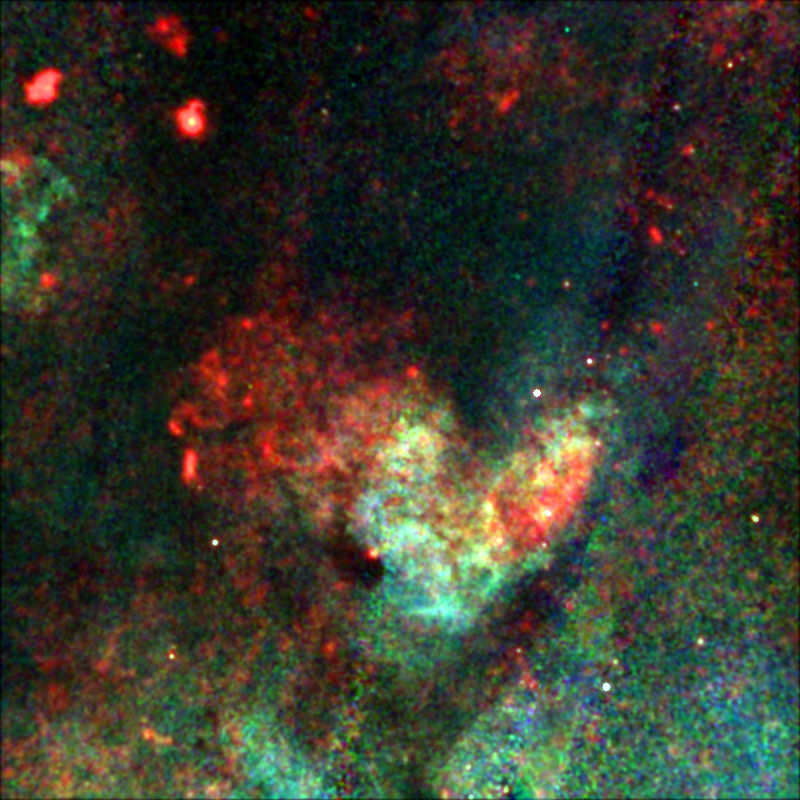
Soft X-ray image of the Orion–Eridanus Superbubble with ROSAT.

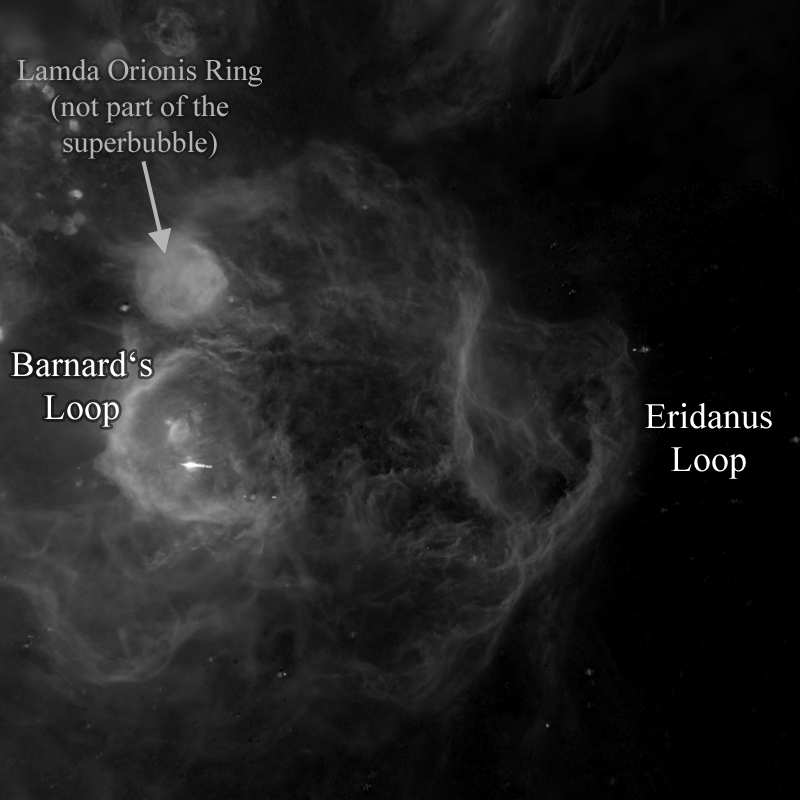
The Orion–Eridanus superbubble in Hydrogen-alpha, with the Barnard's Loop and Eridanus Loop. Image covers the same area of the sky as the left image.

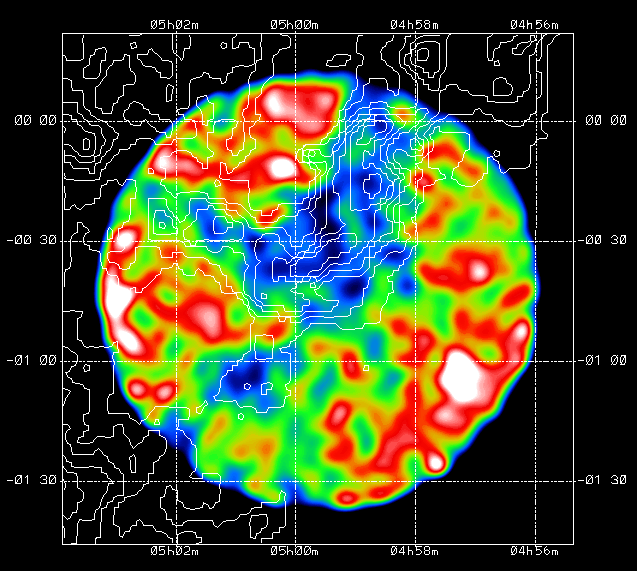
Part of the Orion–Eridanus Superbubble with ROSAT. The contours are 100 Mircon IRAS observations and show the shielding of soft x-rays by a filament. The circular shape of X-ray emission is due to ROSAT's field of view, not the shape of superbubble itself.

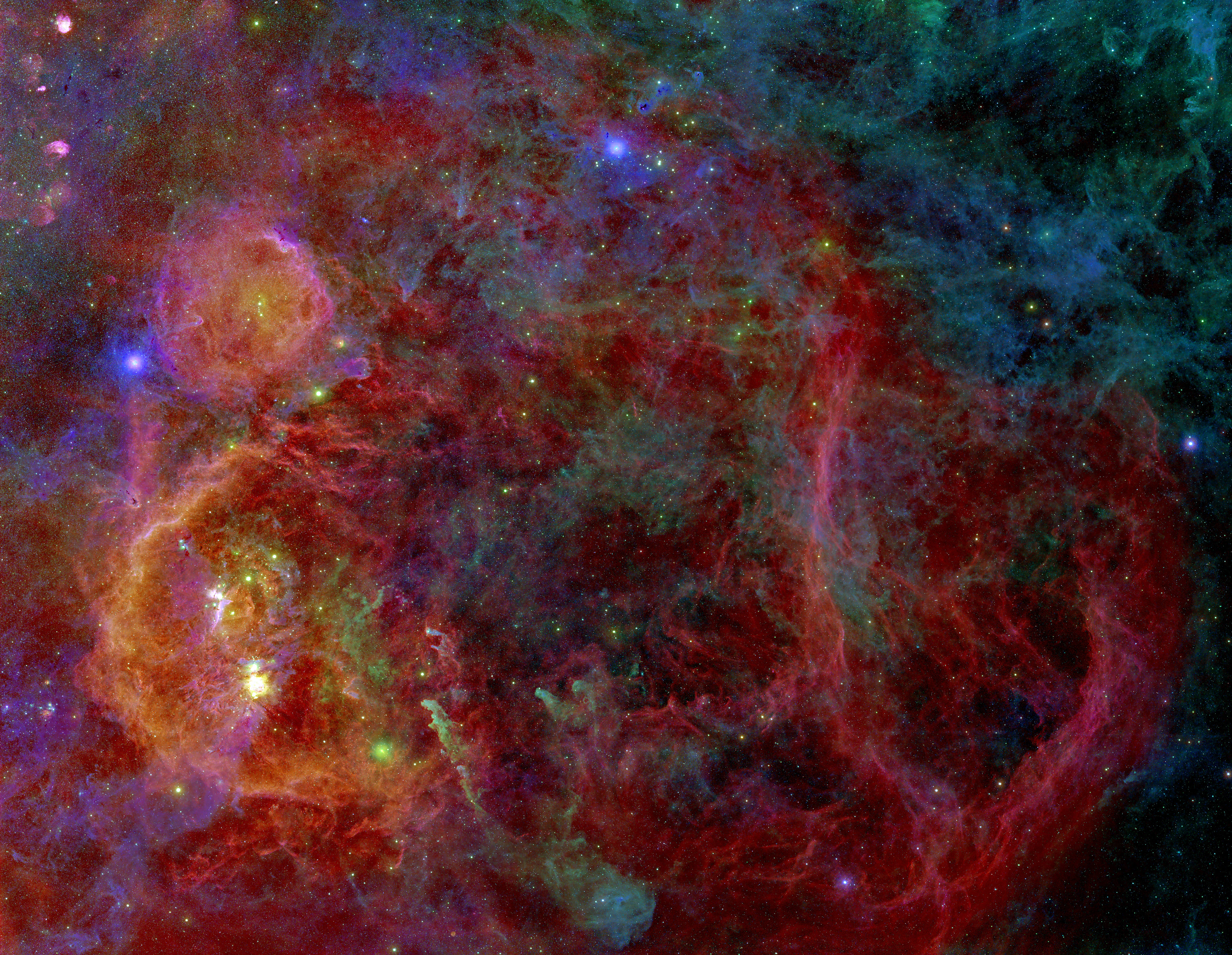
50°×39° view of the Orion–Eridanus Superbubble from the Northern Sky Narrowband Survey showing Hα (red) and continuum (green and blue).

== See also ==
- Barnard's Loop
