= Barnard's Loop =

Emission nebula in the constellation of Orion

Emission nebula
- H II region
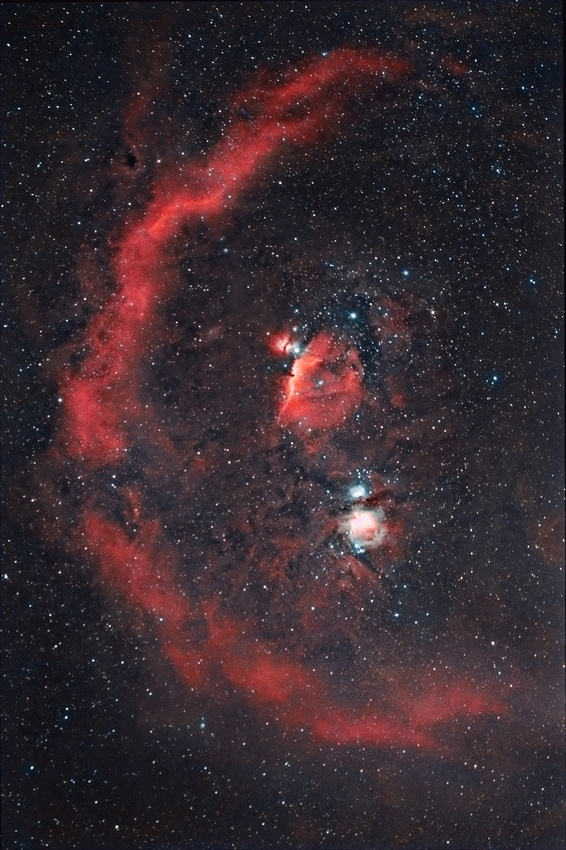
- Barnard's Loop can be seen on this image as a diffuse red semicircle.

Observation data: J2000 epoch
- Right ascension: 05^{h} 27.5^{m}
- Declination: −03° 58′
- Distance: either 518 or 1434 ly
- Apparent magnitude (V): 5
- Apparent dimensions (V): 10°
- Constellation: Orion

Physical characteristics
- Radius: either 50 or 150 ly
- Designations: Sh 2-276

Barnard's Loop (catalogue designation Sh 2-276) is an emission nebula in the constellation of Orion. It is part of the Orion–Eridanus Superbubble, which itself belongs to the Orion molecular cloud complex. The loop takes the form of a large arc centered roughly on the dark Horsehead and the bright Orion Nebula, whose stars are believed to be responsible for ionizing the loop.

The loop extends over about 10° as seen from Earth, covering much of Orion. It is best seen in long-exposure photographs, although observers under very dark skies may be able to see it with the naked eye.

It is about 440 parsecs (1,400 ly) away and 110 parsecs (360 ly) in length. It is thought to have originated in a supernova explosion about 2 million years ago, which may have also created several known runaway stars, including AE Aurigae, Mu Columbae and 53 Arietis, which are believed to have been part of a multiple star system in which one component exploded as a supernova.

Although this faint nebula was certainly observed by earlier astronomers, it is named after the pioneering astrophotographer E. E. Barnard who photographed it and published a description in 1894.

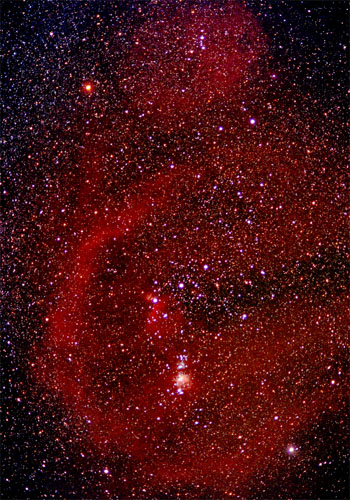
Long exposure of Orion with red clouds of ionized hydrogen (H-alpha). The big bow on the left is Barnard's Loop.

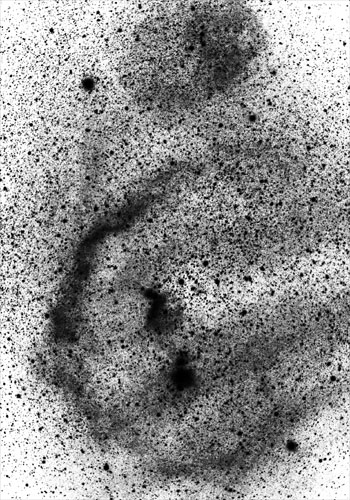
Previous photo of Barnard's Loop nebula in inverted black and white of the red channel

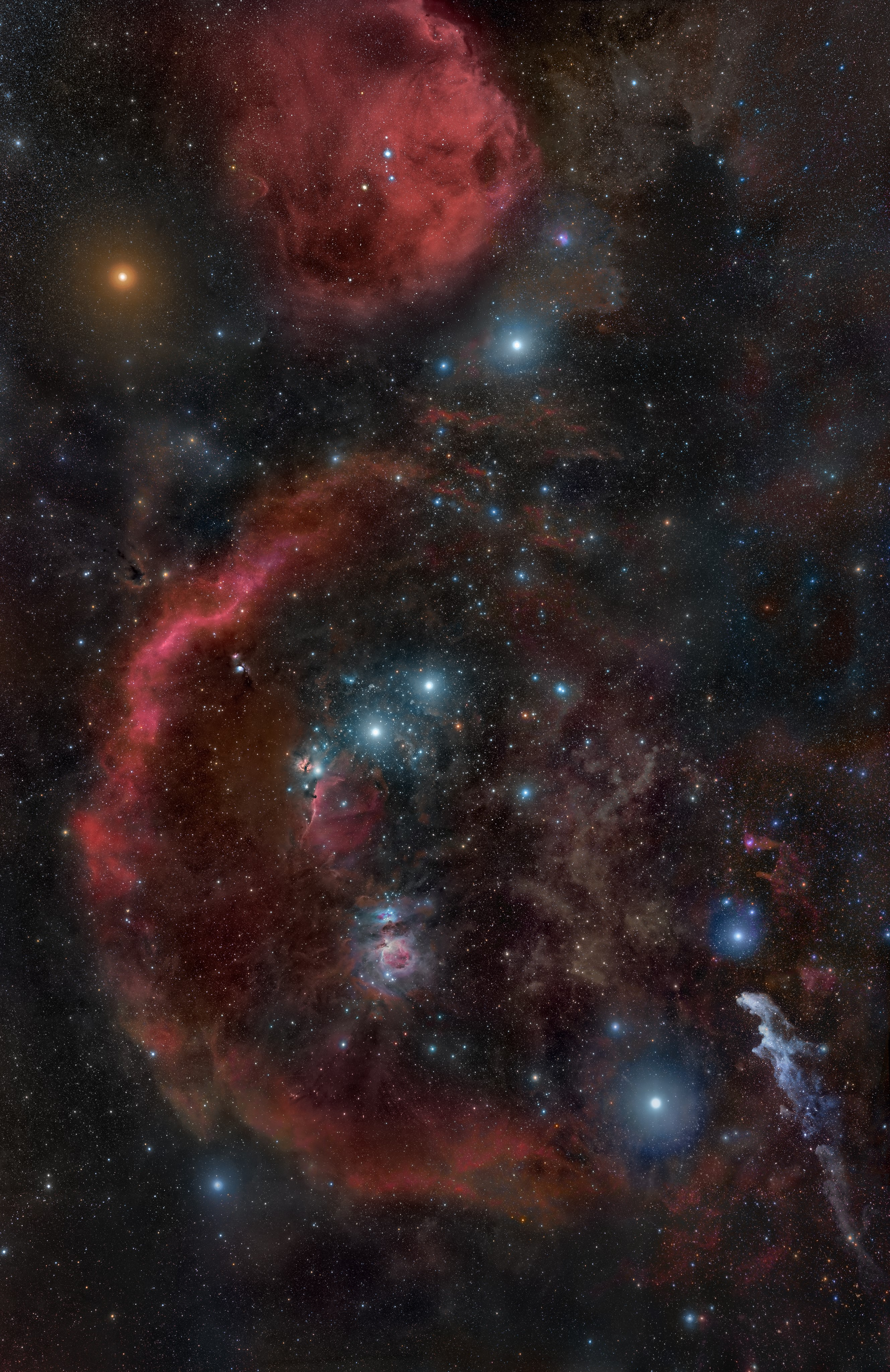
Barnard's Loop seen against the major stars and nebula of Orion

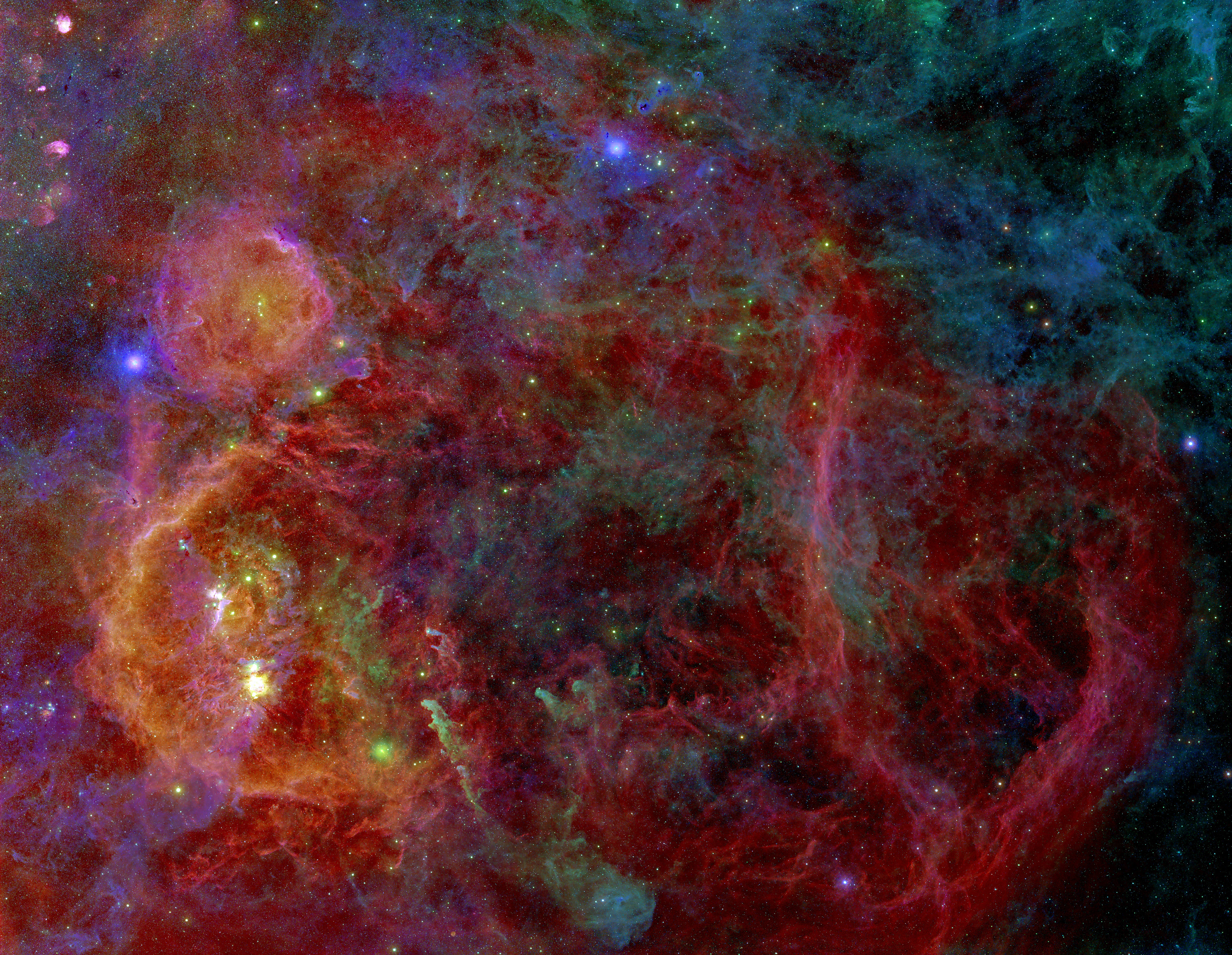
Barnard's Loop (mostly orange) as a part of the Orion–Eridanus Superbubble, imaged by the Northern Sky Narrowband Survey.
