= Jack G. Hills =

American astronomer and mathematician

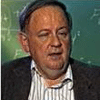
- Born: Jack Gilbert Hills; May 15, 1943 (age 83); Kevlavik, Iceland
- Citizenship: U.S.
- Education: University of Kansas (AB, MA); University of Michigan (PhD)
- Known for: Hills mechanism Hills cloud
- Scientific career
- Fields: Astrophysics
- Workplaces: Los Alamos National Laboratory
- Thesis: Dynamical Evolution of the Solar System (1969)
- Doctoral advisor: Richard L. Sears

Jack Gilbert Hills (born 15 May 1943) is a theorist of stellar dynamics. He worked on the Oort cloud; the inner part of it, the Hills cloud, was named after him. The Hills mechanism is also named after him.

He studied at the University of Kansas, where he was awarded an A.B. in 1966 and an M.A. in 1967. He was also awarded an M.S. and a PhD by the University of Michigan, Ann Arbor. He defended his thesis on the formation and evolution of the Solar System in 1969. His advisor was Richard L. Sears.

He spent much of his professional career at Los Alamos National Laboratory, which named him a Laboratory Fellow in 1998.

The Hills mechanism in astrophysics is also named after him. He proposed the mechanism in the 1980s.

He was inducted a Fellow of the American Physical Society in 1983. His citation read that he was proposed for "seminal theoretical work on the physics of dense stellar systems and in particular for proposing and developing his model of the energy source of quasars."
