= NLTT 11748 =

Star system in the constellation Taurus

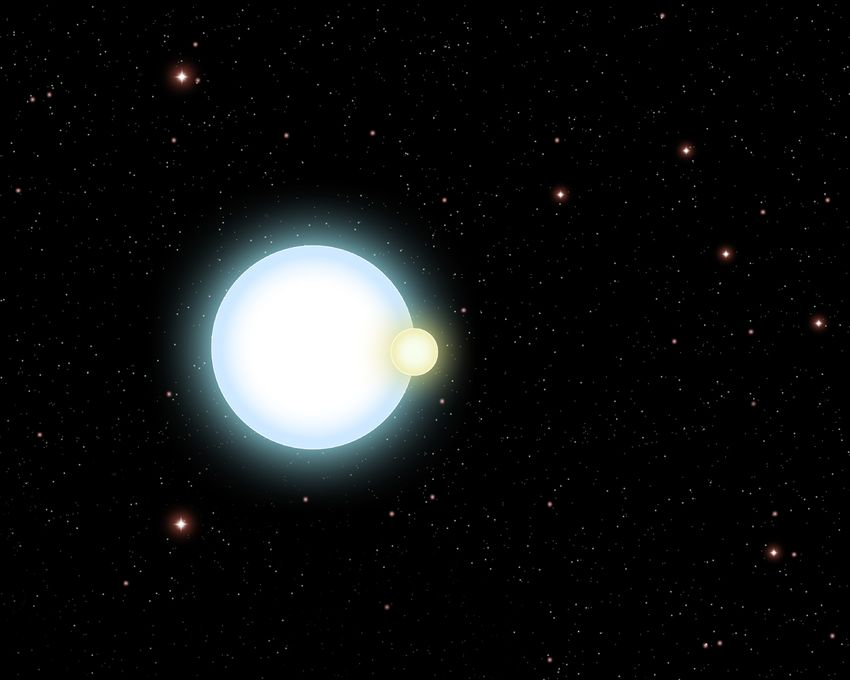
- Artistic illustration of the binary star NLTT 11748

Observation data Epoch J2000 Equinox ICRS
- Constellation: Taurus
- Right ascension: 03^{h} 45^{m} 16.830^{s}
- Declination: +17° 48′ 08.70″
- Apparent magnitude (V): 16.7

Characteristics
- Spectral type: WD+WD
- Variable type: EA

Astrometry
Radial velocity (R_{v})	+415±50 km/s
Proper motion (μ)	RA: 234.264 mas/yr Dec.: -178.568 mas/yr
Parallax (π)	5.5076±0.0607 mas
Distance	592 ± 7 ly (182 ± 2 pc)

Orbit
Period (P)	0.2350606 d (5.64145 h)
Eccentricity (e)	0
Inclination (i)	89.67±0.12°
Semi-amplitude (K_{1}) (primary)	273.4±0.5 km/s
Semi-amplitude (K_{2}) (secondary)	52.4±2.1 km/s

Details

NLTT 11748 A
Mass	0.136 – 0.162 M_{☉}
Radius	0.0423 – 0.0433 R_{☉}
Surface gravity (log g)	6.32 – 6.38 cgs
Temperature	8540 – 8690 K
Age	4.0 – 6.3 Gyr

NLTT 11748 B
Mass	0.707 – 0.740 M_{☉}
Radius	0.0108 – 0.0111 R_{☉}
Surface gravity (log g)	8.22±0.01 cgs
Temperature	7600±120 K
Age	1.6 – 1.7 Gyr

Other designations
- LP 413-40, WD 0342+176, Gaia DR3 44582933060466560

Database references
SIMBAD	data

NLTT 11748 is an eclipsing binary star system consisting of two white dwarfs, located in the constellation Taurus at a distance of 592 light-years from the Sun. The system is notable for containing one of the first discovered extremely low-mass white dwarfs (ELM WDs).

== Discovery and Observation History ==
The primary component of the system was identified in 2009 by astronomers A. Kawka and S. Vennum during an analysis of the New Luyten Two-Tenths (NLTT) catalog of stars with large proper motions. It was classified as an anomalously low-mass hydrogen white dwarf with low surface gravity.

In 2010, a group of scientists led by J. Steinfadt, while searching for pulsations, discovered periodic brightness variations. Analysis revealed that the fluctuations were caused by primary (6%) and secondary (3%) eclipses, confirming the object's binary nature. The orbital period of the system is only 5.6 hours.

In 2013–2014, high-precision multicolor photometric observations were conducted using the high-speed camera ULTRACAM. These observations allowed for the determination of the physical parameters of both components with an accuracy of a few percent and the highly significant detection of the Roemer delay (7σ). The Roemer delay is the classical light travel time across the Earth's orbit, which is also used for other objects such as pulsars in binary systems.

== Component Characteristics ==
=== Primary Star ===
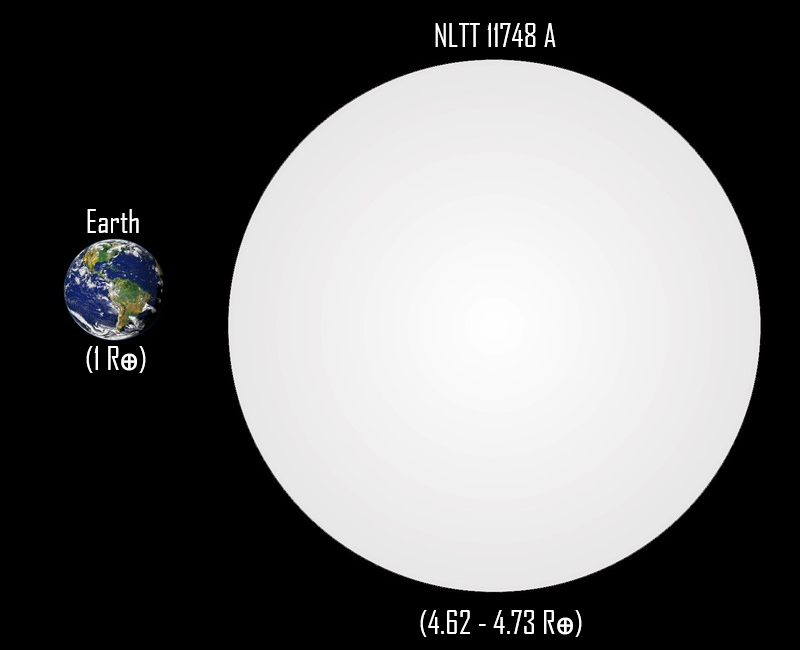
Comparison of the sizes of Earth and NLTT 11748 A

This component is optically brighter and physically larger in the system, despite its low mass. It belongs to a rare class of extremely low-mass white dwarfs, with a mass in the range of 0.136 to 0.162 M☉ and a radius of 0.0423 to 0.0433 R☉, comparable to the size of large gas giants. The effective surface temperature is estimated to be in the range of 8540 to 8690 K. The atmosphere consists predominantly of hydrogen. It is surrounded by a thick residual hydrogen envelope, at the base of which stable but slow hydrogen burning continues, which slows down the star's cooling. The surface gravity, log g, is 6.32 - 6.38 cgs, which is significantly lower than that of average white dwarfs.

=== Secondary Star ===
It is a classical white dwarf that has completed its evolution via the standard path. It gravitationally dominates the system but is practically unnoticeable in the optical range against the background of its companion. The mass of this object is in the range of 0.707 to 0.740 M☉, with a radius of 0.0108 – 0.0111 R☉. The surface gravity, log g, is 8.22 cgs, which is typical for white dwarfs. The surface temperature is 7600 K. The star is devoid of internal energy sources and radiates solely from the heat reserves accumulated during contraction. Its cooling age is estimated to be 1.6 - 1.7 billion years.

== Evolutionary Origin and Future ==
According to current astrophysical models, the NLTT 11748 system originated from a complex interaction between progenitor stars. Initially, it was a binary system consisting of an intermediate-mass star and a low-mass companion with a mass of approximately 0.87 - 0.93 M☉. As the more massive star expanded, Roche lobe overflow occurred, leading to mass transfer. In subsequent stages, the donor star lost its outer hydrogen envelope before helium burning began in its core, leaving behind a degenerate low-mass helium core.

Under the influence of gravitational radiation, the components of the system gradually approach each other. Due to its relatively large distance from Earth, the current amplitude of gravitational waves from NLTT 11748 is insufficient for direct detection by the LISA space interferometer. Nevertheless, in the long term, when the orbital period shortens to a critical minimum, a renewed mass transfer process will begin in the system, from the helium dwarf to a carbon-oxygen star. This could lead to either a merger of the components, forming a massive single white dwarf, or the formation of an ultra-compact binary system of the AM CVn type.
