= Hills mechanism =

Black hole effect on a binary star

The Hills mechanism is a phenomenon that occurs when a binary star system is disrupted by a supermassive black hole.

Tidal forces from the black hole cause one of the stars to be captured by it, and fall into an orbit around it. The other star is thrown away from the black hole at very high speeds. The phenomenon was proposed by astronomer Jack Hills in 1988 and confirmed in 2019, when an example of such a jettisoned star was observed. This ejected star, S5-HVS1, was determined to be travelling away from the galactic core of the Milky Way at 1,755 km/s (3,930,000 mph), almost 0.6% of the speed of light).

== See also ==
- Penrose process
