= ULAS J0015+01 =

Star

ULAS J0015+01 (full name ULAS J001535.72+015549.6) is a red giant in the constellation of Pisces discovered on July 10, 2014 as the farthest star gravitationally bound to the Milky Way. It is estimated to lie at 900,000 light-years from Earth, beyond the reaches of the Magellanic Clouds. Another star, ULAS J0744+25, was a bit closer. These stars are thought to be remnants of either the Milky Way's creation, or the merging of it with another small galaxy.

== Discovery ==
ULAS J0015+01 was discovered on the 10th of July, 2014 with the UKIRT Infrared Deep Sky Survey and the Sloan Digital Sky Survey. Both of these stars being cool red giants, they are extremely bright which is one of the key factors in their discovery. Their distance was estimated with a number of different techniques, which all pointed towards 900,000 light years away.

== Distance ==
ULAS J0015+01 is, at the current time, 900,000 light years away from the Milky Way. The Milky Way's disk is 180,000 light years in diameter, putting it far beyond the Milky Way stellar disk, or only 3 times closer than the Andromeda galaxy. In comparison, in distance to the Milky Way's satellite galaxy, the Large Magellanic Cloud, is only 160,000 light-years from Earth. ULAS J0015+01 and ULAS J0744+25 are not technically in a galaxy, but they are both classified as being in the Milky Way's outer halo, which stretches at least 500,000 light years away. These stars were both the first to be discovered beyond 200 kpc.

== Formation ==
ULAS J0015+01 has been thought to either be a remnant of the Milky Way's formation or a merger with a different galaxy. Analysis of the surrounding environment does not favor the presence of a star within such a place of low density important for star formation. Another explanation was that this star was part of a population of stars that was stripped from their parent galaxy by the Milky Way. If it were originally part of the Milky Way, it would have been ejected at a high velocity of around 600 km/s. Another hypothesis was it is part of an unknown galaxy with low surface brightness, but that seems unlikely. No other stars have been discovered past ULAS J0015+01 or ULAS J0744+25, which almost completely gets rid of the unknown galaxy hypothesis.
