= Michael J. Kurtz =

American astronomer

Michael J. Kurtz is an astrophysicist at Harvard University, He has held the title of Astronomer at the Center for Astrophysics | Harvard & Smithsonian since 1983, and the additional post of Computer Scientist at the Smithsonian Astrophysical Observatory since 1984. He is especially known both for his research into the distribution of galaxies, and for his creation of the Astrophysics Data System.

== Biography ==
Kurtz received a BA in Physics from San Francisco State University in 1977 and a Ph.D. from Dartmouth College in 1982. From 1984 to 1992 he was Director of the Image Processing Laboratory.

== Publications ==
His h-index is 38.

=== Astronomy ===
His most cited papers in astronomy are:

- Falco, Emilio E.; Kurtz, Michael J.; Geller, Margaret J.; Huchra, John P.; Peters, James; Berlind, Perry; Mink, Douglas J.; Tokarz, Susan P.; Elwell, Barbara (1999). "The Updated Zwicky Catalog (UZC)". Publications of the Astronomical Society of the Pacific. 111 (758): 438. arXiv:astro-ph/9904265. Bibcode:1999PASP..111..438F. doi:10.1086/316343. S2CID 14298026. (cited 340 times according to Google Scholar)
- Kurtz, Michael J.; Mink, Douglas J. (1998). "RVSAO 2.0: Digital Redshifts and Radial Velocities". Publications of the Astronomical Society of the Pacific. 110 (750): 934–977. arXiv:astro-ph/9803252. Bibcode:1998PASP..110..934K. doi:10.1086/316207. S2CID 1311627. (cited 288 times in Google Scholar)
- Da Costa, L. Nicolaci; Geller, M. J.; Pellegrini, P. S.; Latham, D. W.; Fairall, A. P.; Marzke, R. O.; Willmer, C. N. A.; Huchra, J. P.; Calderon, J. H.; Ramella, M.; Kurtz, M. J. (1994). "A complete southern sky redshift survey". The Astrophysical Journal. 424: L1. Bibcode:1994ApJ...424L...1D. doi:10.1086/187260. (cited 167 times in Google Scholar)
- Da Costa, L. Nicolaci; Willmer, C. N. A.; Pellegrini, P. S.; Chaves, O. L.; Rité, C.; Maia, M. A. G.; Geller, M. J.; Latham, D. W.; Kurtz, M. J.; Huchra, J. P.; Ramella, M.; Fairall, A. P.; Smith, C.; Lípari, S. (1998). "The Southern Sky Redshift Survey". The Astronomical Journal. 116 (1): 1–7. arXiv:astro-ph/9804064. Bibcode:1998AJ....116....1D. doi:10.1086/300410. S2CID 119489132. (cited 174 times in Google Scholar)
- Geller, Margaret J.; Kurtz, Michael J.; Wegner, Gary; Thorstensen, John R.; Fabricant, Daniel G.; Marzke, Ronald O.; Huchra, John P.; Schild, Rudolph E.; Falco, Emilio E. (1997). "The Century Survey: A Deeper Slice of the Universe". The Astronomical Journal. 114: 2205. arXiv:astro-ph/9710109. Bibcode:1997AJ....114.2205G. doi:10.1086/118640. S2CID 15858323. (cited 114 times in Google Scholar)

=== Bibliometrics/Scientometrics ===
His most cited publications in bibliometrics/scientometrics are

- "The Effect of Use and Access on Citations", by Kurtz, Michael J., Eichhorn, Guenther, Accomazzi, Alberto, Grant, Carolyn, Demleitner, Markus, Henneken, Edwin, and Murray, Stephen S.; Information Processing and Management, 41, 1395 (2005) cited 185 times in Google Scholar
- "The NASA Astrophysics Data System: Overview", by Kurtz, Michael J., Eichhorn, Guenther, Accomazzi, Alberto, Grant, Carolyn S., Murray, Stephen S., and Watson, Joyce M.; Astronomy and Astrophysics Supplement Series, 143, 41 (2000) cited 104 times in Google Scholar
- "The Bibliometric Properties of Article Readership Information", by Kurtz, Michael J., Eichhorn, Guenther, Accomazzi, Alberto, Grant, Carolyn S., Demleitner, Markus, Murray, Stephen S., Martimbeau, Nathalie, and Elwell, Barbara; Journal of the American Society for Information Science and Technology, 56, 111 (2005) cited 100 times in Google Scholar
- "Worldwide Use and Impact of the NASA Astrophysics Data System Digital Library", by Kurtz, Michael J., Eichhorn, Guenther, Accomazzi, Alberto, Grant, Carolyn S., Demleitner, Markus, and Murray, Stephen S.; Journal of the American Society for Information Science and Technology, 56, 36 (2005) cited 95 times in Google Scholar
- "Usage Bibliometrics", by Kurtz, Michael J. and Bollen, Johan; Annual Review of Information Science and Technology, 44, 3 (2010) cited 58 times in Google Scholar
- "Intelligent Text Retrieval in the NASA Astrophysics Data System", by Kurtz, M. J., Karakashian, T., Grant, C. S., Eichhorn, G., Murray, S. S., Watson, J. M., Ossorio, P. G., and Stoner, J. L.; Astronomical Data Analysis Software and Systems II, 52, 132 (1993) cited 32 times in Google Scholar

== Awards ==
- Elected a Legacy Fellow of the American Astronomical Society in 2020.
- Van Biesbroeck Prize, American Astronomical Society, 2001, for design of the ADS Abstract Service
- ISI/ASIST Citation Award, American Society for Information Science and Technology, 2000,
