= Orion molecular cloud complex =

Star-forming region in the constellation Orion

Molecular cloud
- Molecular cloud complex
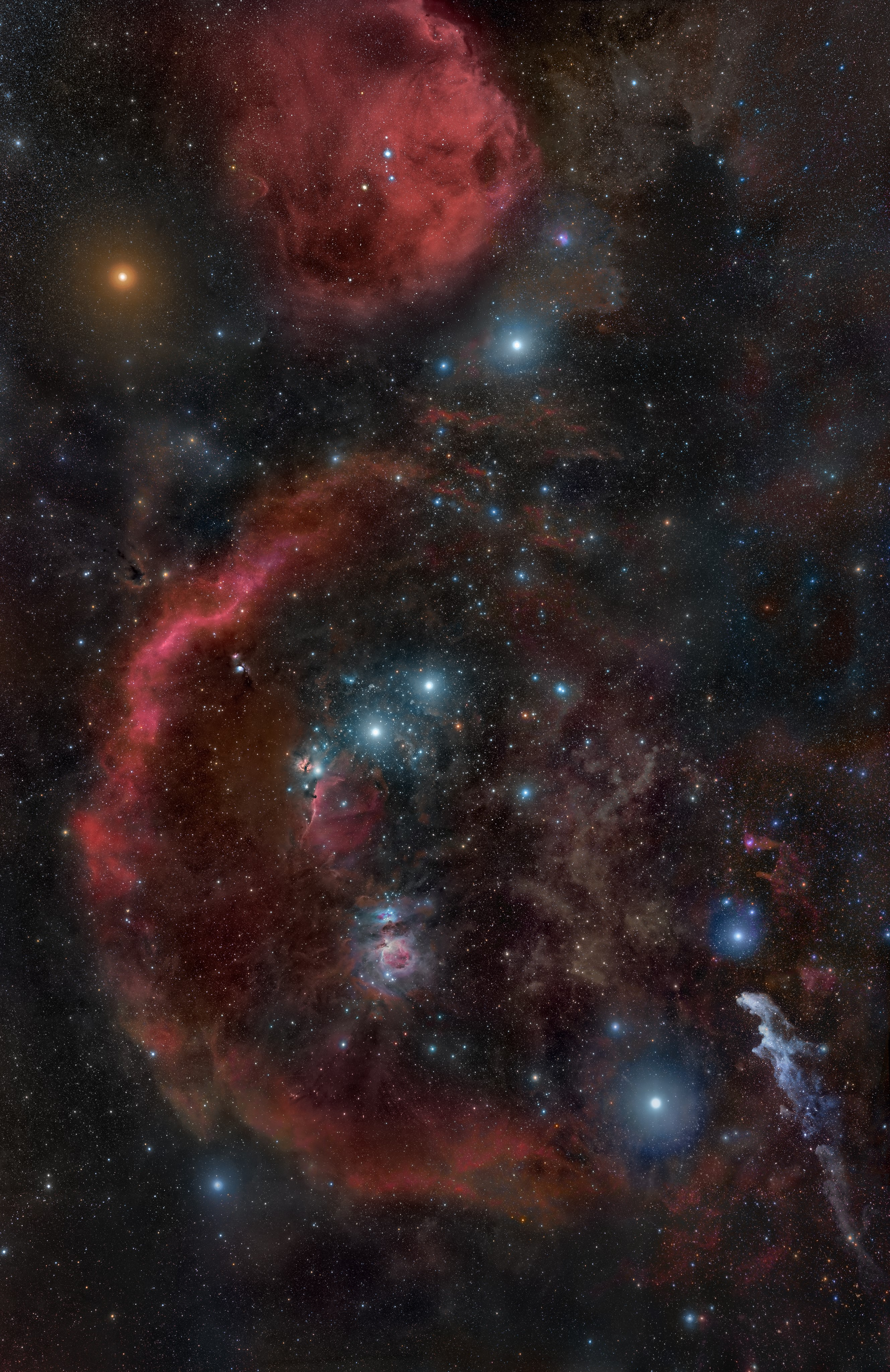
- Part of the Orion molecular cloud complex, with the Great Nebula in Orion near the center, along with the Belt of Orion, and Barnard's Loop curling around the image

Observation data: J2000.0 epoch
- Right ascension: 05^{h} 35.3^{m}
- Declination: −05° 23′
- Constellation: Orion
- Designations: Orion complex, Orion cloud complex, Orion molecular cloud complex

The Orion molecular cloud complex (or, simply, the Orion complex) is a star-forming region with stellar ages ranging up to 12 Myr. Two giant molecular clouds are a part of it, Orion A and Orion B. The stars currently forming within the complex are located within these clouds. A number of other somewhat older stars no longer associated with the molecular gas are also part of the complex, most notably the Orion's Belt (Orion OB1b), as well as the dispersed population north of it (Orion OB1a). Near the head of Orion there is also a population of young stars that is centered on Meissa. The complex is between 1 000 and 1 400 light-years away, and hundreds of light-years across.

The Orion complex is one of the most active regions of nearby stellar formation visible in the night sky, and is home to both protoplanetary discs and very young stars. Much of it is bright in infrared wavelengths due to the heat-intensive processes involved in stellar formation, though the complex contains dark nebulae, emission nebulae, reflection nebulae, and H II regions. The presence of ripples on the surface of Orion's molecular clouds was discovered in 2010. The ripples are a result of the expansion of the nebulae gas over pre-existing molecular gas.

The Orion complex includes a large group of bright nebulae and dark clouds in the Orion constellation. Several nebulae can be observed through binoculars and small telescopes, and some parts (such as the Orion Nebula) are visible to the naked eye.

== Nebulae within the complex ==
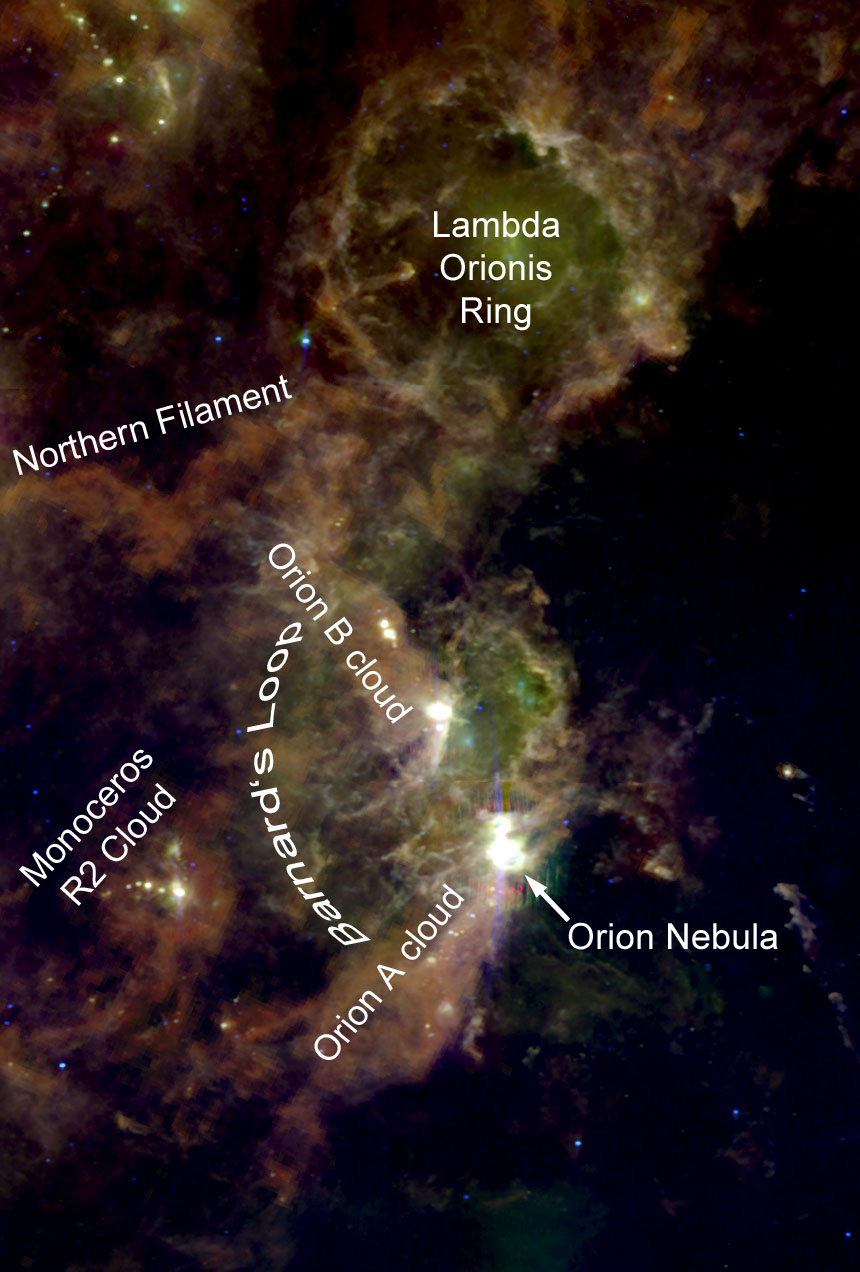
A labeled map of the Orion molecular cloud, with the images taken by IRAS and various telescopes that mapped CO in this part of the sky

The following is a list of notable regions within the larger complex:

- Orion A molecular cloud
  - The Orion Nebula, also known as M42 (part of Orion's Sword)
  - M43, which is part of the Orion Nebula
  - Sh2-279 (part of Orion's Sword)
  - NGC 1980 (part of Orion's Sword)
  - Orion Molecular Clouds
    - Orion molecular cloud 1 (OMC-1) with the Becklin–Neugebauer Object and the Kleinmann–Low Nebula
    - Orion molecular cloud 2 (OMC-2)
    - Orion molecular cloud 3 (OMC-3)
    - Orion molecular cloud 4 (OMC-4)
  - NGC 1981
  - NGC 1999
  - HH 222 (also known as Waterfall Nebula), above NGC 1999
  - HH 34 a Herbig–Haro object with symmetric bow shocks
  - LDN 1641
  - HH 1/2, the first recognized Herbig–Haro objects
- Orion B molecular cloud
  - Flame Nebula (NGC 2024)
  - IC 434, which contains the Horsehead Nebula
  - The Horsehead Nebula (Barnard 33)
  - M78, a reflection nebula (NGC 2068)
  - McNeil's Nebula is a variable nebula discovered in 2004 near M78
  - Orion East Cloud (LDN 1621 + LDN 1622)
  - HH 24-26 this group contains three Herbig–Haro objects
  - HH 111 one of the most well-known Herbig–Haro objects
- Orion OB1 association
  - Orion's Belt
  - Sigma Ori cluster
  - 25 Ori cluster
- Lambda Orionis molecular ring (Sh2-264)
  - Lambda Ori cluster
  - Barnard 30
  - Barnard 35 (Angelfish nebula)
- Orion-Eridanus superbubble
  - Barnard's Loop (Sh2-276)
  - IC 2118
  - Eridanus Loop
    - Arc A
    - Arc B
    - Arc C

A more complete list can be found for example in Maddalena et al. (1986) Table 1

== Individual components ==
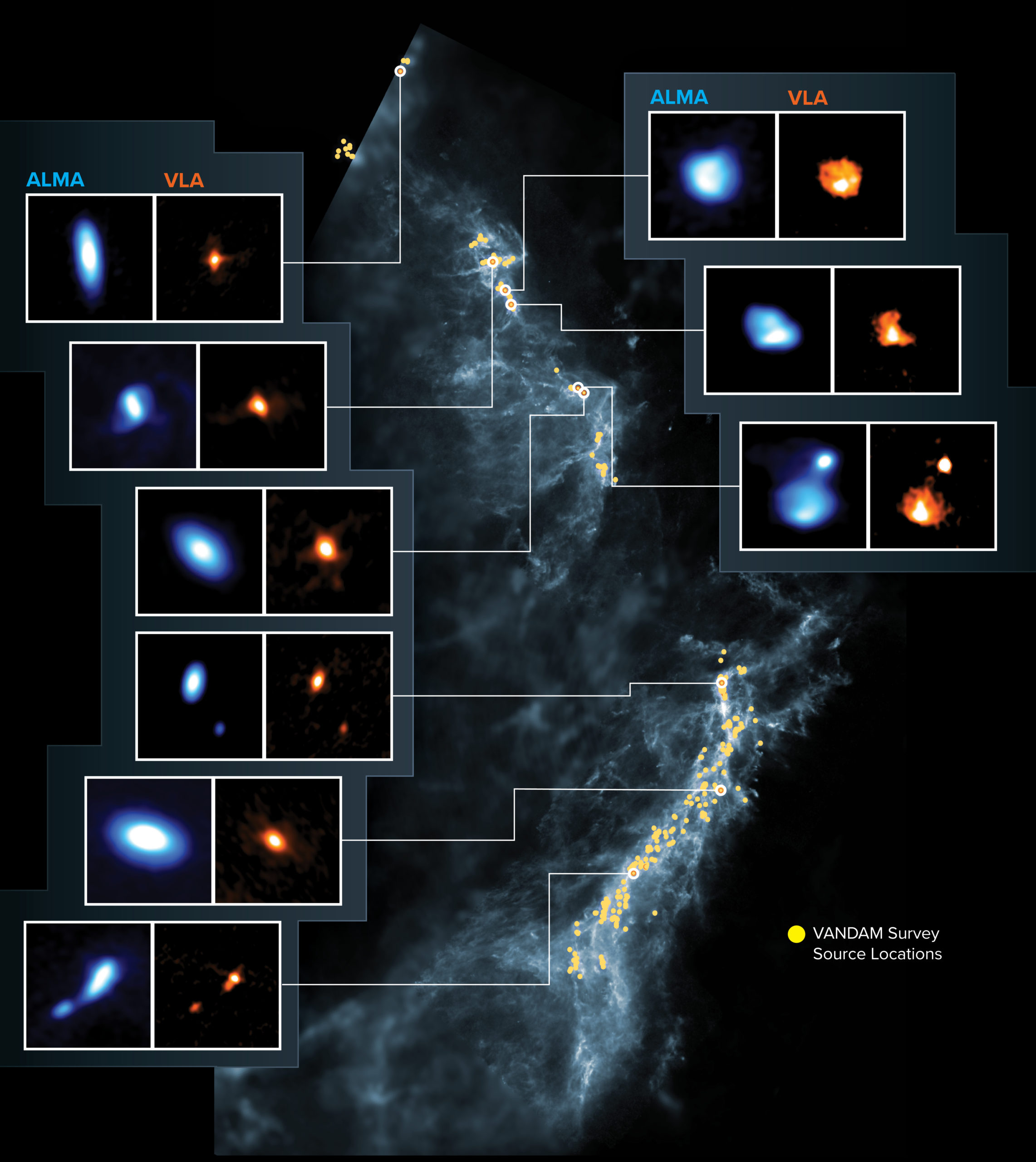
Young stars in Orion A and Orion B molecular clouds. The clouds were imaged by Herschel and the newborn stars were imaged by ALMA and the VLA.

=== Orion A ===
The giant molecular cloud Orion A is the most active star-forming region in the local neighbourhood of the Sun. In the last few million years about 3000 young stellar objects were formed in this region, including about 190 protostars and about 2600 pre-main sequence stars. The Orion A cloud has a mass in the order of 10^{5} M_{☉}. The stars in Orion A do not have the same distance to us. The "head" of the cloud, which also contains the Orion Nebula is about 1300 light-years (400 parsecs) away from the Sun. The "tail" however is up to 1530 light-years (470 parsecs) away from the Sun. The Orion A cloud is therefore longer than the projected length of 130 light-years (40 parsecs) and has a true length of 290 light-years (90 parsecs).

==== Orion Molecular Clouds ====
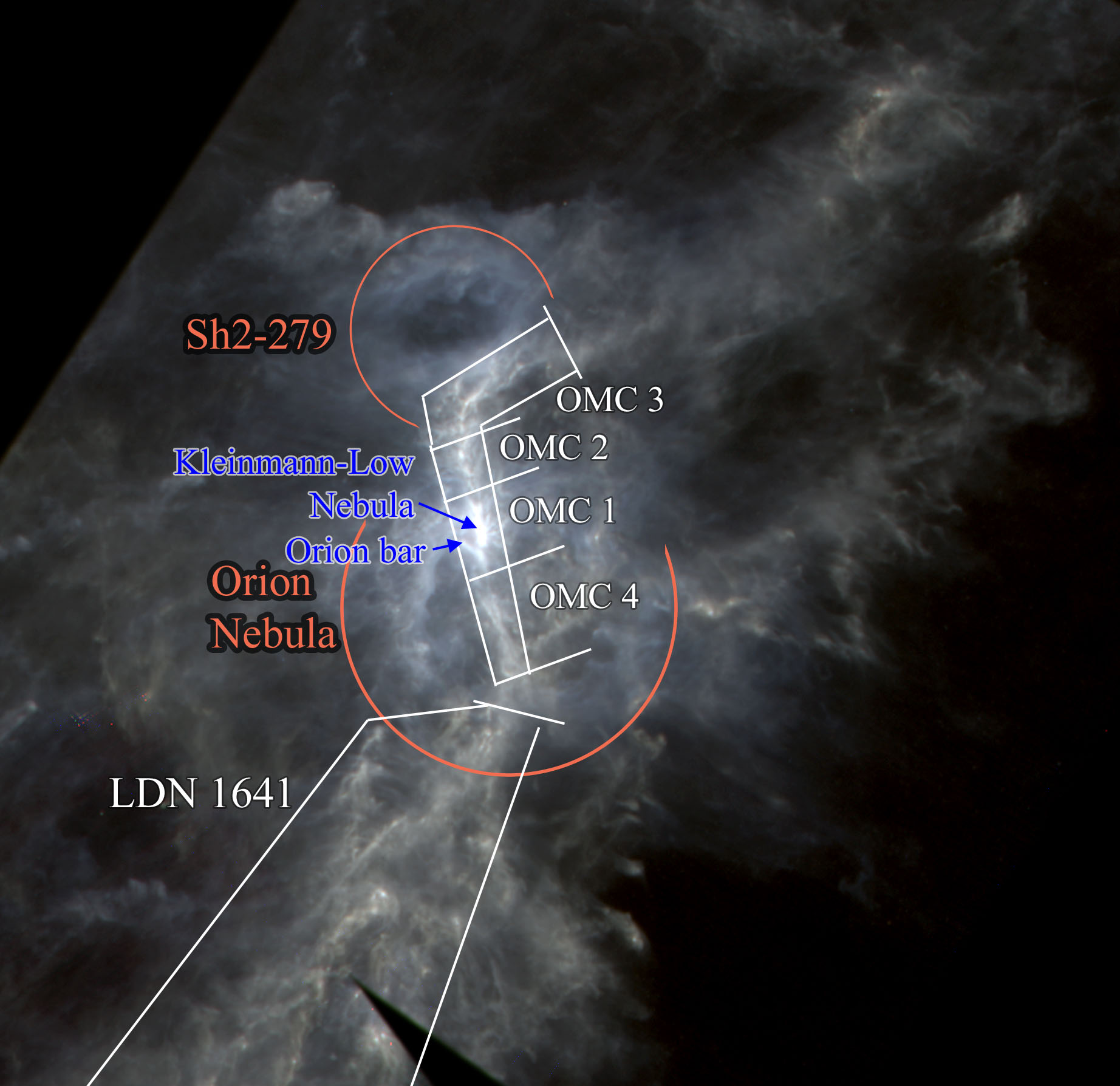
Position of the Orion Molecular Clouds

The Orion Molecular Clouds (OMC 1 to OMC 4) are molecular clouds located behind the Orion Nebula. Most of the light from the OMCs are blocked by material from the Orion Nebula, but some features like the Kleinmann-Low Nebula and the Becklin-Neugebauer object can be seen in the infrared. The clouds can be seen in the far-infrared and in radio wavelengths. The Trapezium Cluster has a small angular separation from the Kleinmann-Low Nebula, but the Trapezium Cluster is located inside the Orion Nebula, which is closer towards Earth.

=== Orion B ===
Orion B is about 1370 light-years (420 parsecs) from Earth. It has a size of about 1.5 kpc² and a mass in the order of 10^{5} M_{☉}. It contains several star forming regions with the star cluster inside the Flame Nebula being the largest cluster.

=== Orion OB1 association ===
The Orion OB1 association represents different stellar populations that are superimposed along our line of sight. The oldest group with 8–10 million years is Orion OB1a, northwest of Orion's Belt, and the youngest group with less than 2 million years is Orion OB1d, which contains the Orion Nebula cluster and NGC 2024.

=== Lambda Orionis molecular ring ===
The Lambda Orionis ring is a large molecular ring, centered around Lambda Orioinis (Meissa). It was suggested that this ring formed after a supernova occurred inside the central star-forming region that once surrounded the Lambda Orionis Cluster, dispersing the material into the ring seen today. Star-formation is still continuing in regions of the ring.

=== Superbubble ===
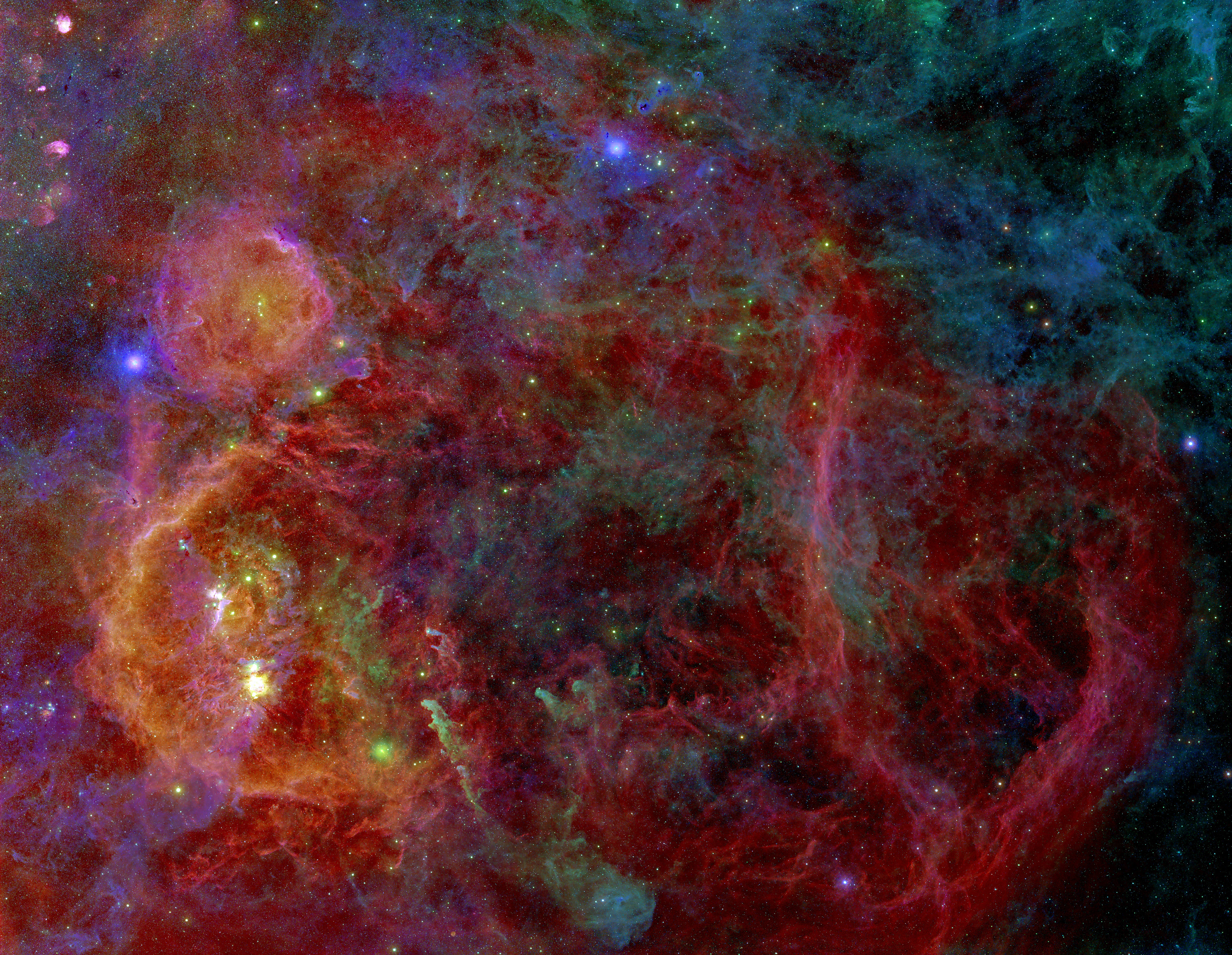
HII regions (red) and molecular clouds (green to blue) in the Orion–Eridanus Superbubble seen by the Northern Sky Narrowband Survey. The reflection nebulae in the northwestern (upper right) part of the image belong to molecular clouds in Taurus.

Parts of the Orion-Eridanus superbubble were first seen as Barnard's Loop in Hydrogen-alpha images that warp around the eastern portion of Orion. The other part of the superbubble that is seen in H-alpha is the Eridanus Loop. The walls of the entire bubble are seen in far-infrared and HI. Some features of the Eridanus Loop might be as close as 590 light-years (180 parsecs) to the Sun.

== Gallery ==
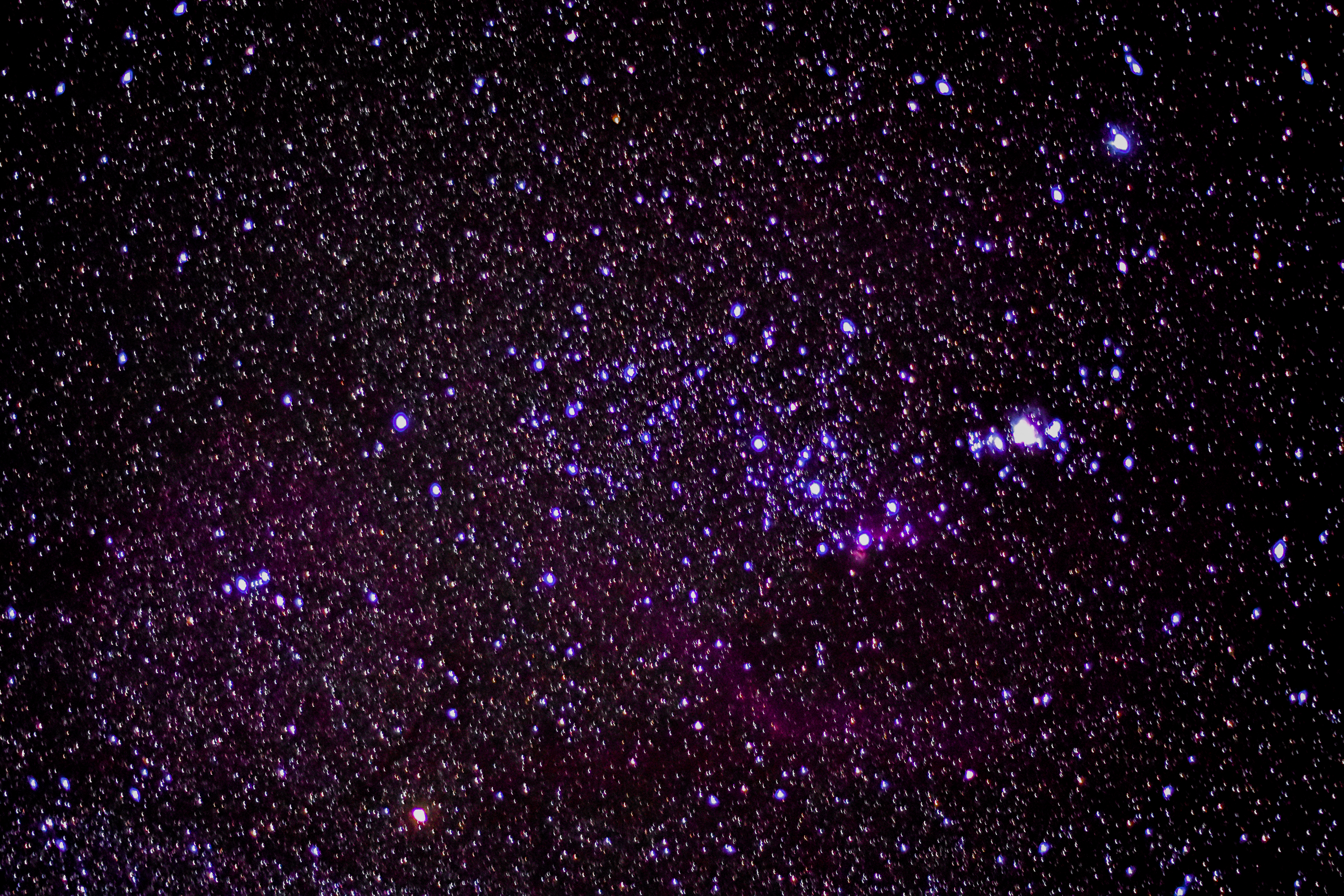
Orion from Leh with the molecular clouds visible.

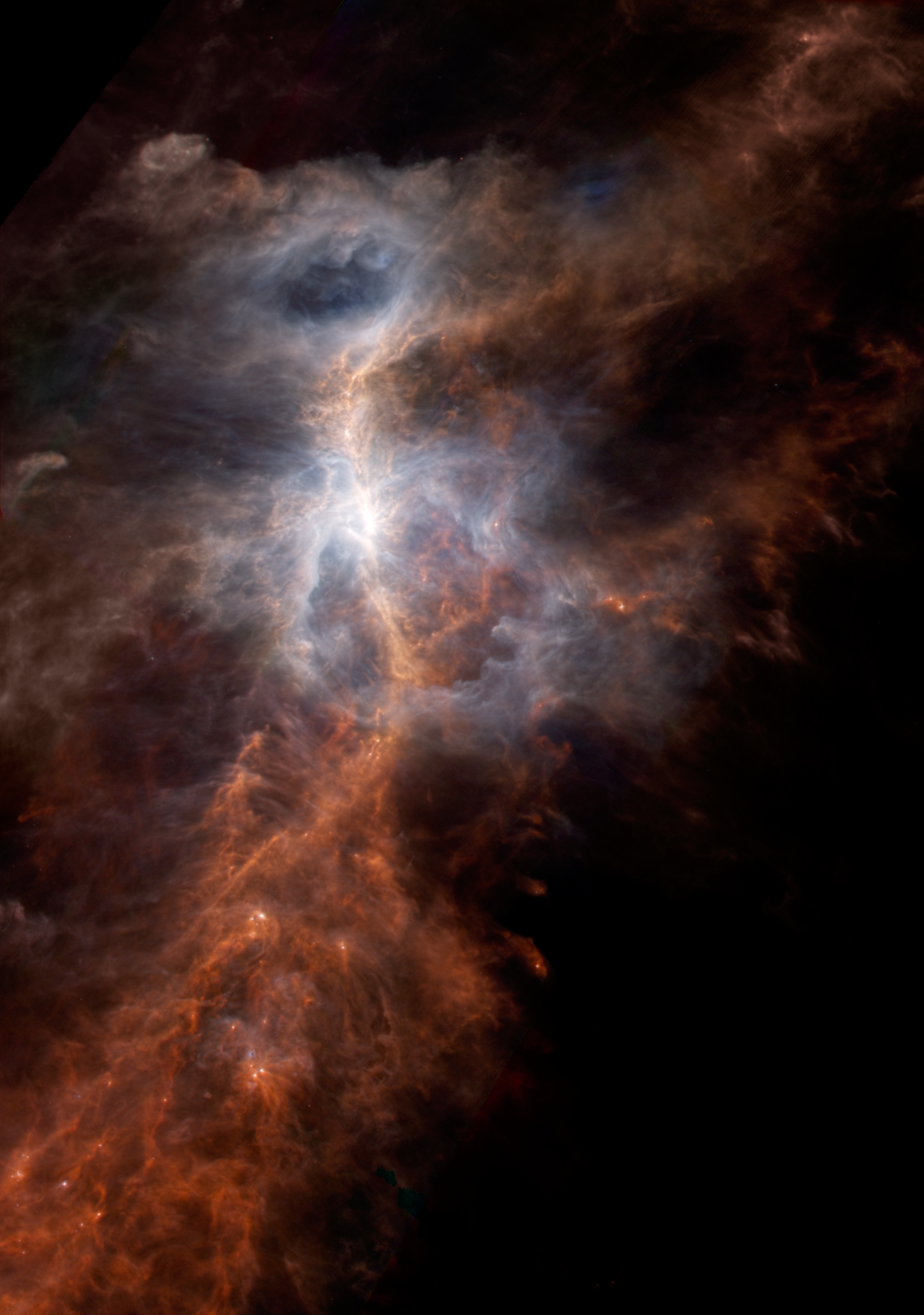
Orion A seen by ESA's Herschel Space Observatory

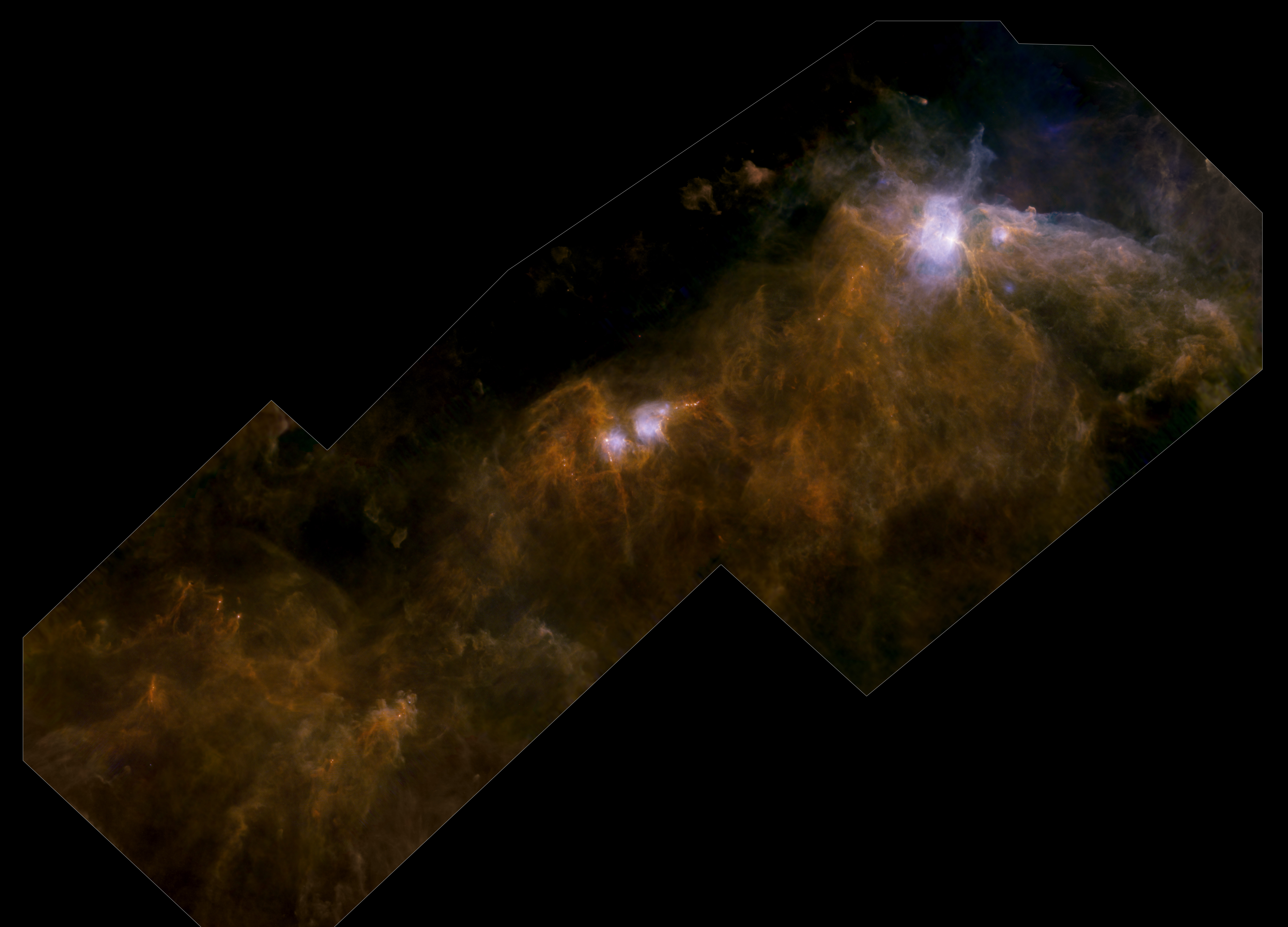
Orion B seen by ESA's Herschel Space Observatory

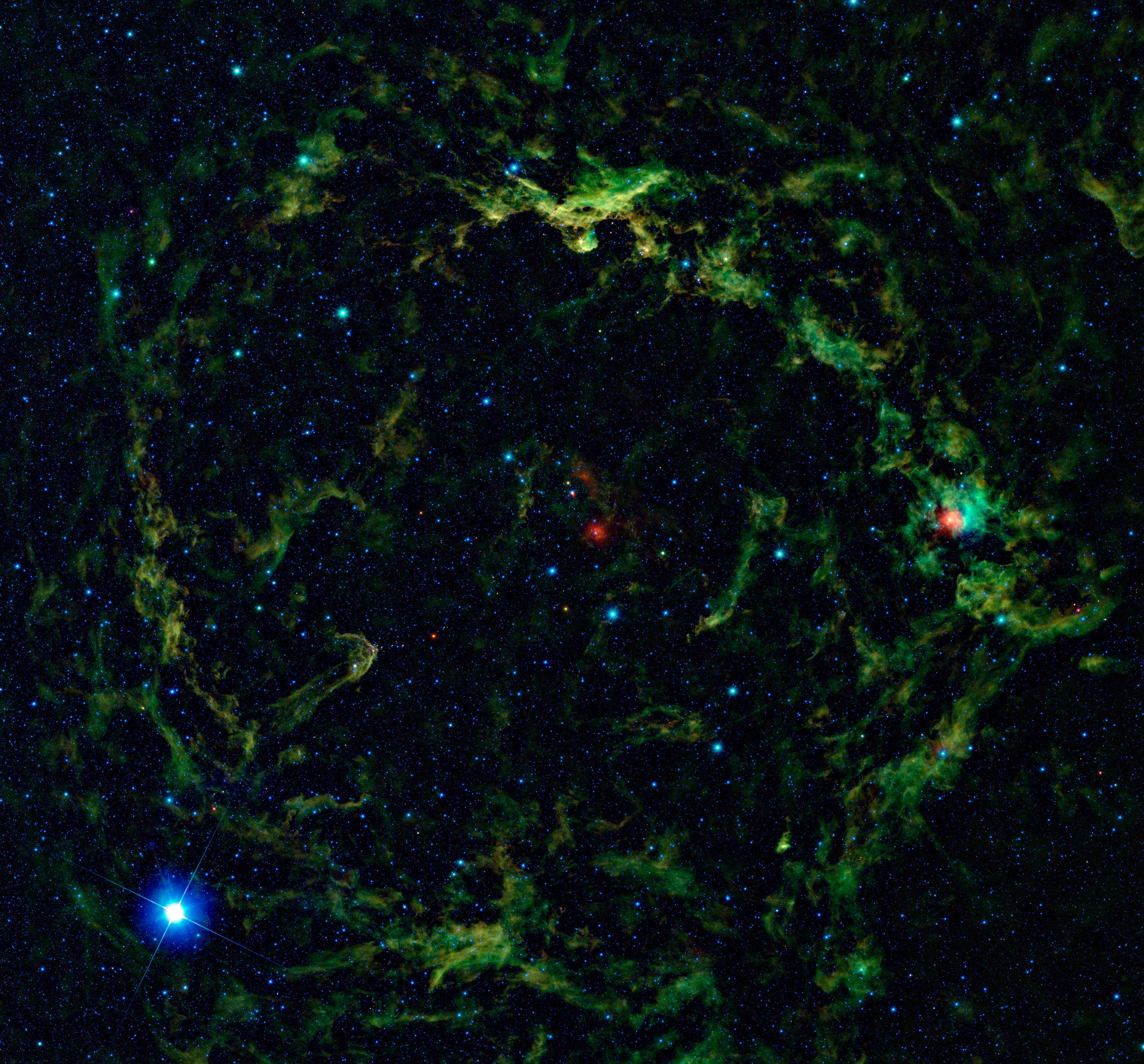
The Lambda Orionis ring seen by NASA's Wide-field Infrared Survey Explorer

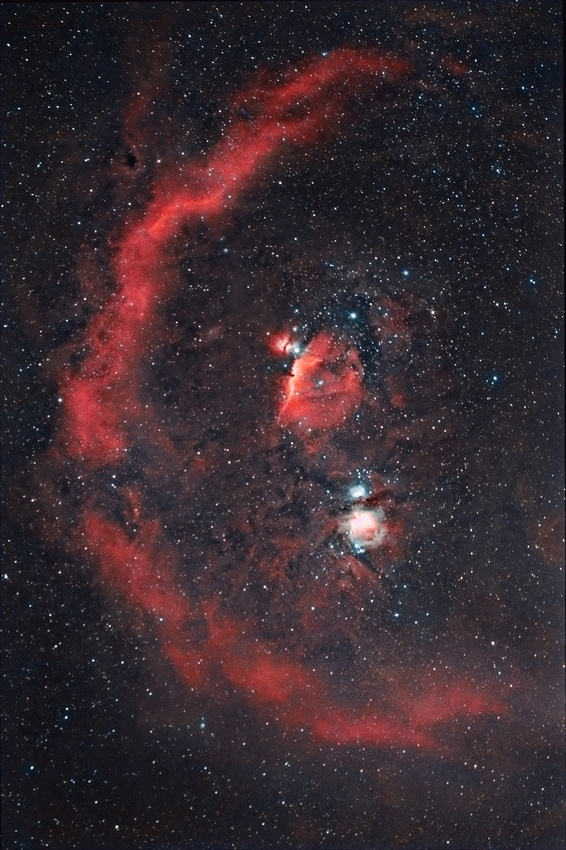
H-alpha image of Barnard's Loop, which is part of the Orion–Eridanus Superbubble

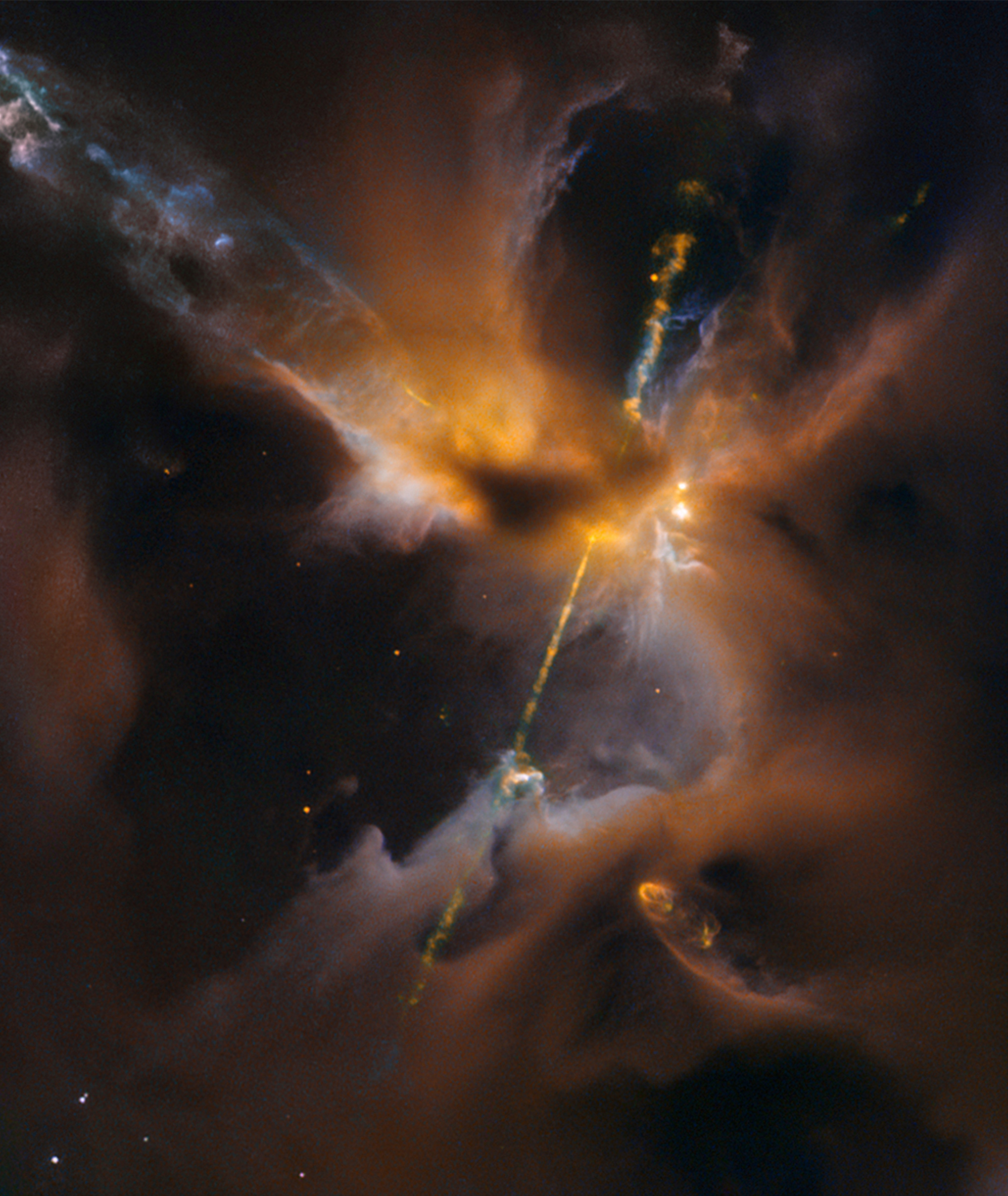
The Herbig–Haro object HH 24, which is located in Orion B

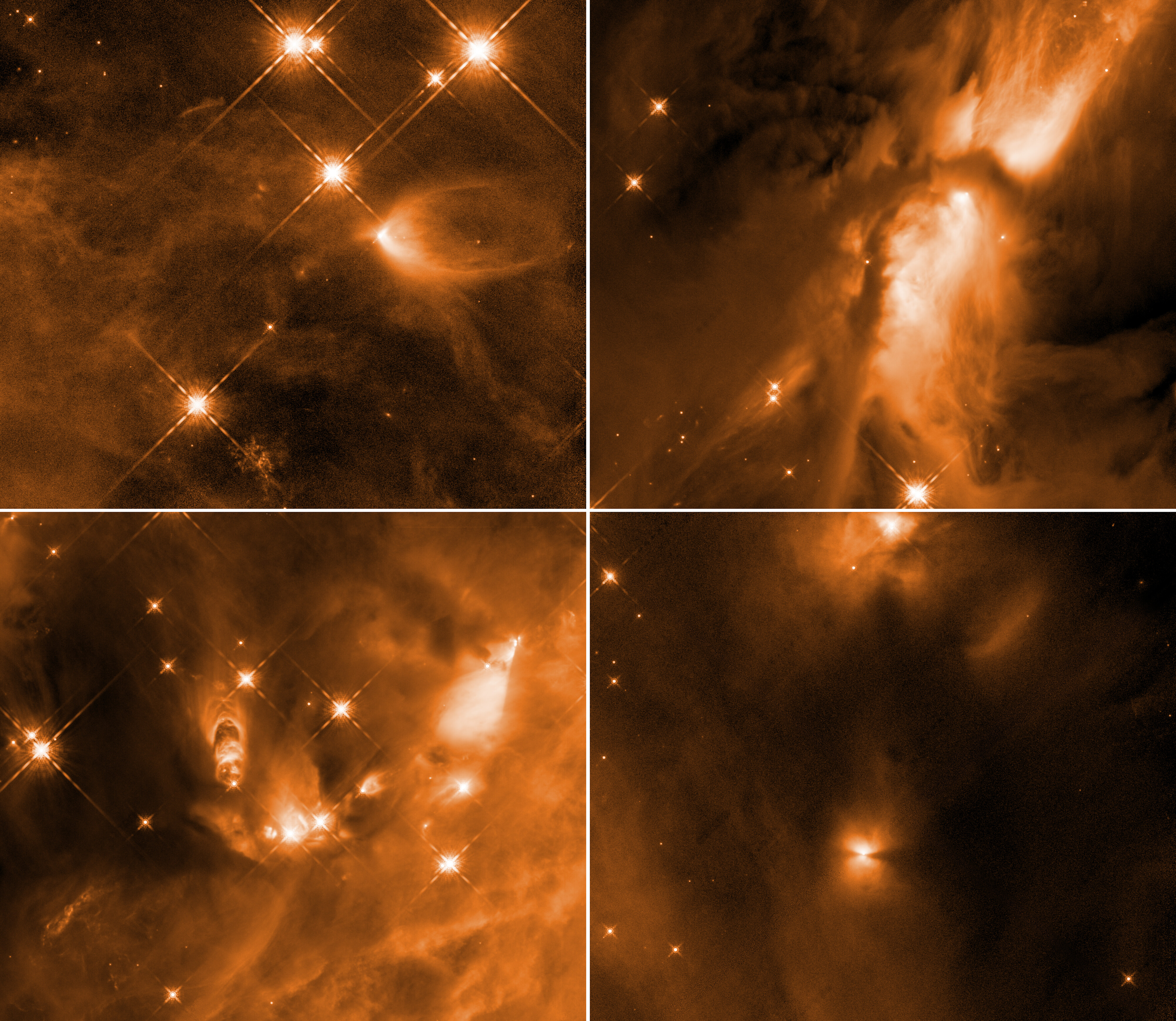
These four images taken by the NASA/ESA Hubble Space Telescope reveal the chaotic birth of stars in the Orion complex, the nearest major star-forming region to Earth.

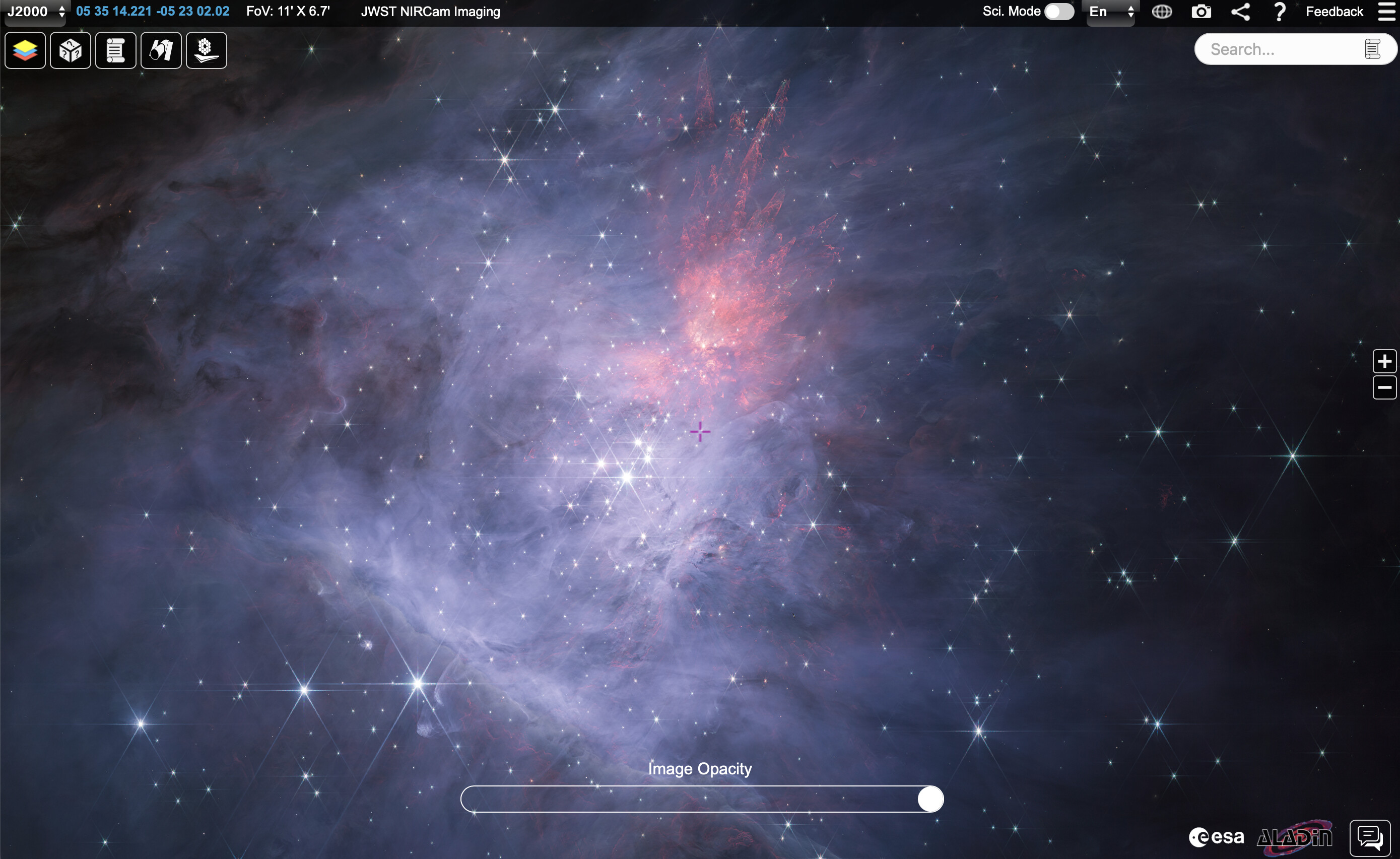
NIRCam mosaic of the inner Orion Nebula

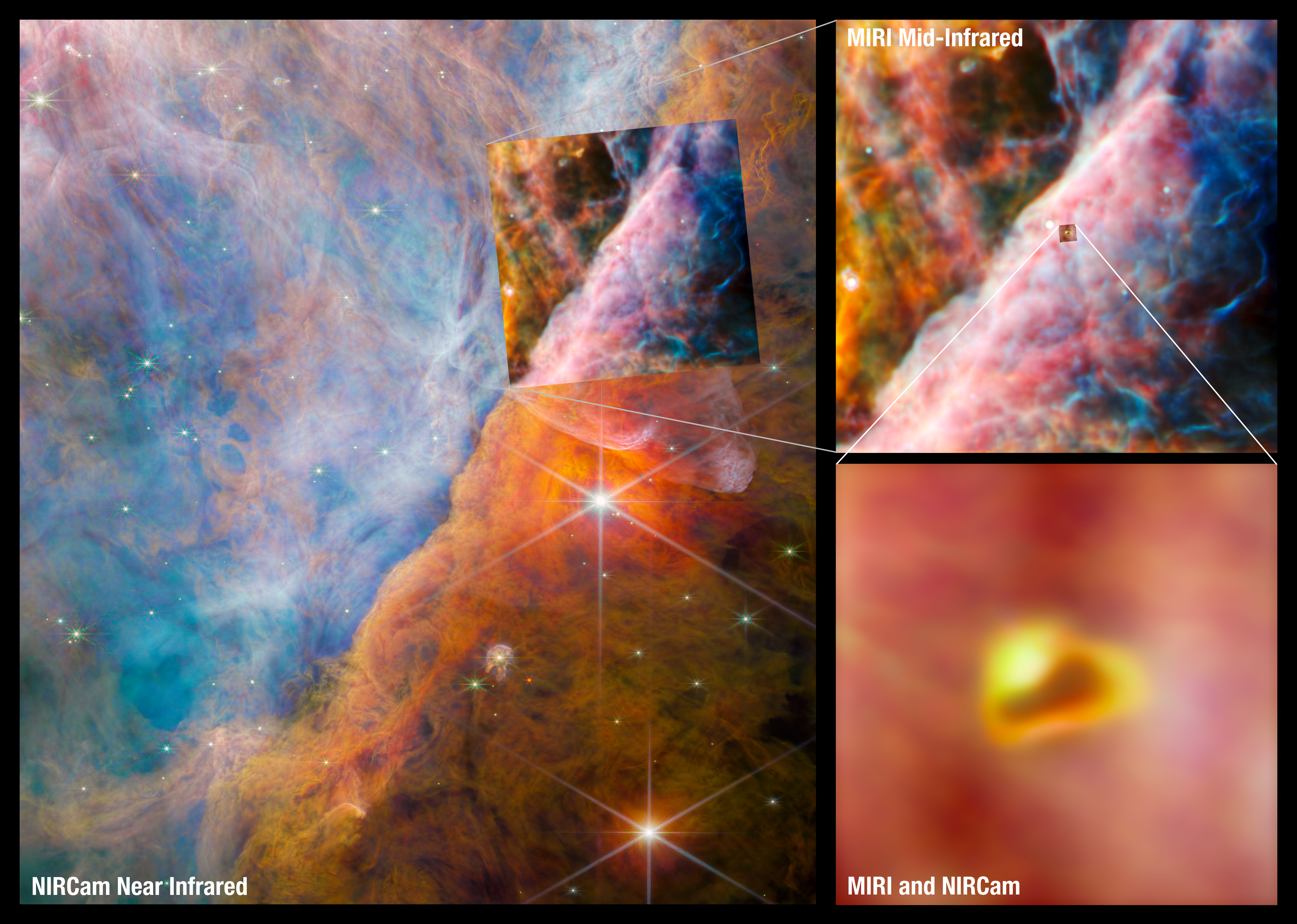
The James Webb Space Telescope made the first detection of crucial carbon molecule

== See also ==
- Runaway star
- Rho Ophiuchi cloud complex
- Taurus molecular cloud
- Perseus molecular cloud
- Scorpius–Centaurus association
