= LDN 1622 =

Dark Nebula in the Constellation Orion

Nebula
- Dark Nebula
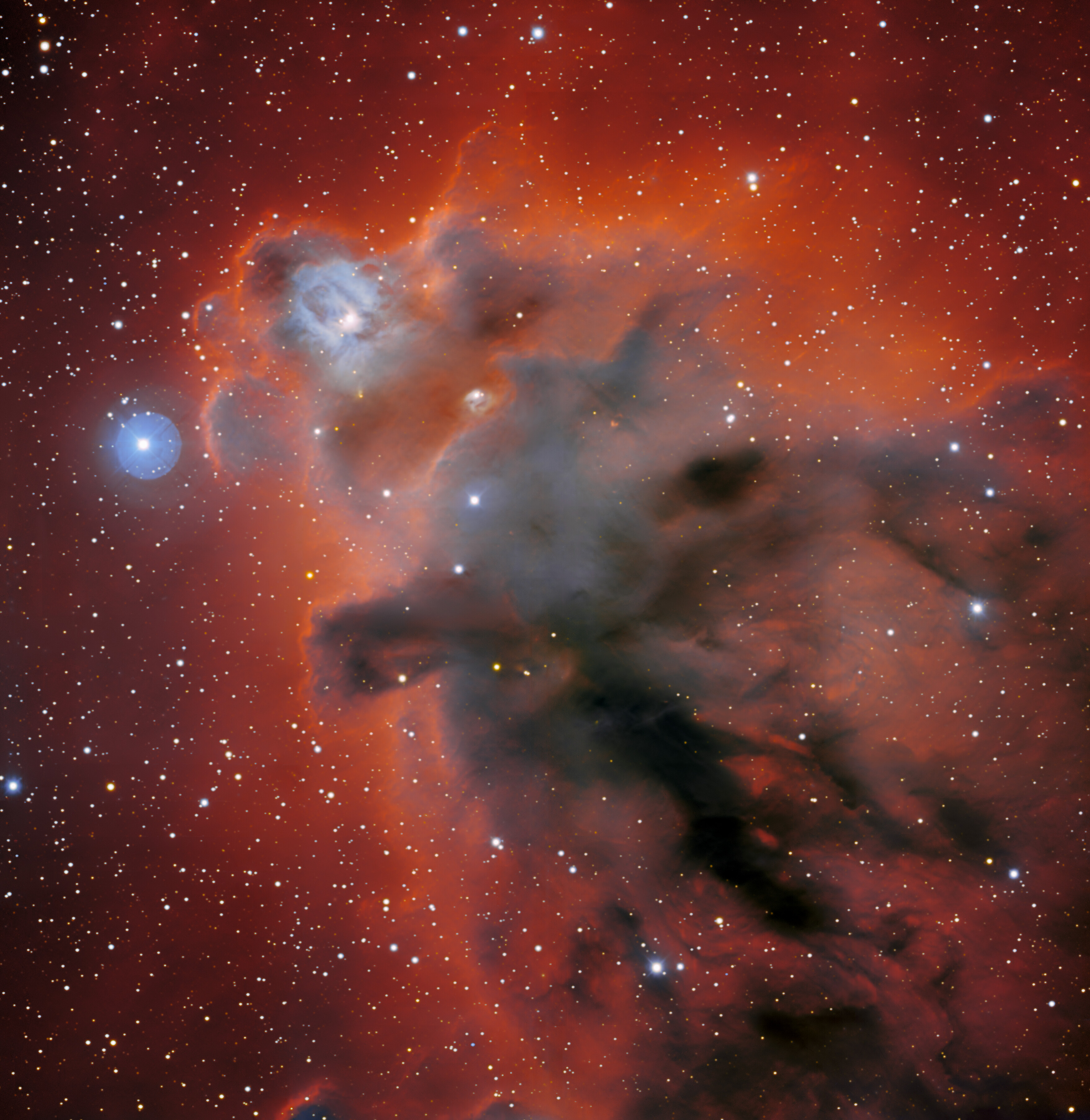
- Image of LDN 1622 from Kitt Peak National Observatory

Observation data: J2000.0 epoch
- Right ascension: 05^{h} 54^{m} 28.00^{s}
- Declination: +01° 48′ 12.0″
- Distance: 1,400 ly
- Constellation: Orion

LDN 1622 (also known as Boogeyman Nebula) is a dark nebula and is part of Barnard's loop in the Orion Molecular Cloud Complex located in the constellation of Orion. It is a dense molecular cloud of cold gas and dust that obscures light from background stars and emission regions.

== Observation ==
As a dark nebula, LDN 1622 is challenging to observe visually or photographically and requires dark skies, long exposures, and often narrowband hydrogen-alpha imaging to reveal it against faint background emission. It is frequently imaged alongside LDN 1621 together known as Orion East Cloud and the reflection nebulae vdB 62 and vdB 63.

LDN 1622 has been studied as a source of anomalous microwave emission (AME). High-resolution observations with Green Bank Telescope at 4.85 GHz and 13.7 GHz revealed a 13.7 GHz AME flux density of 7.0±1.4 mJy, with a rising spectrum toward higher frequencies consistent with the spinning-dust model.
