= Orion Molecular Clouds =

Filament cloud

Molecular cloud
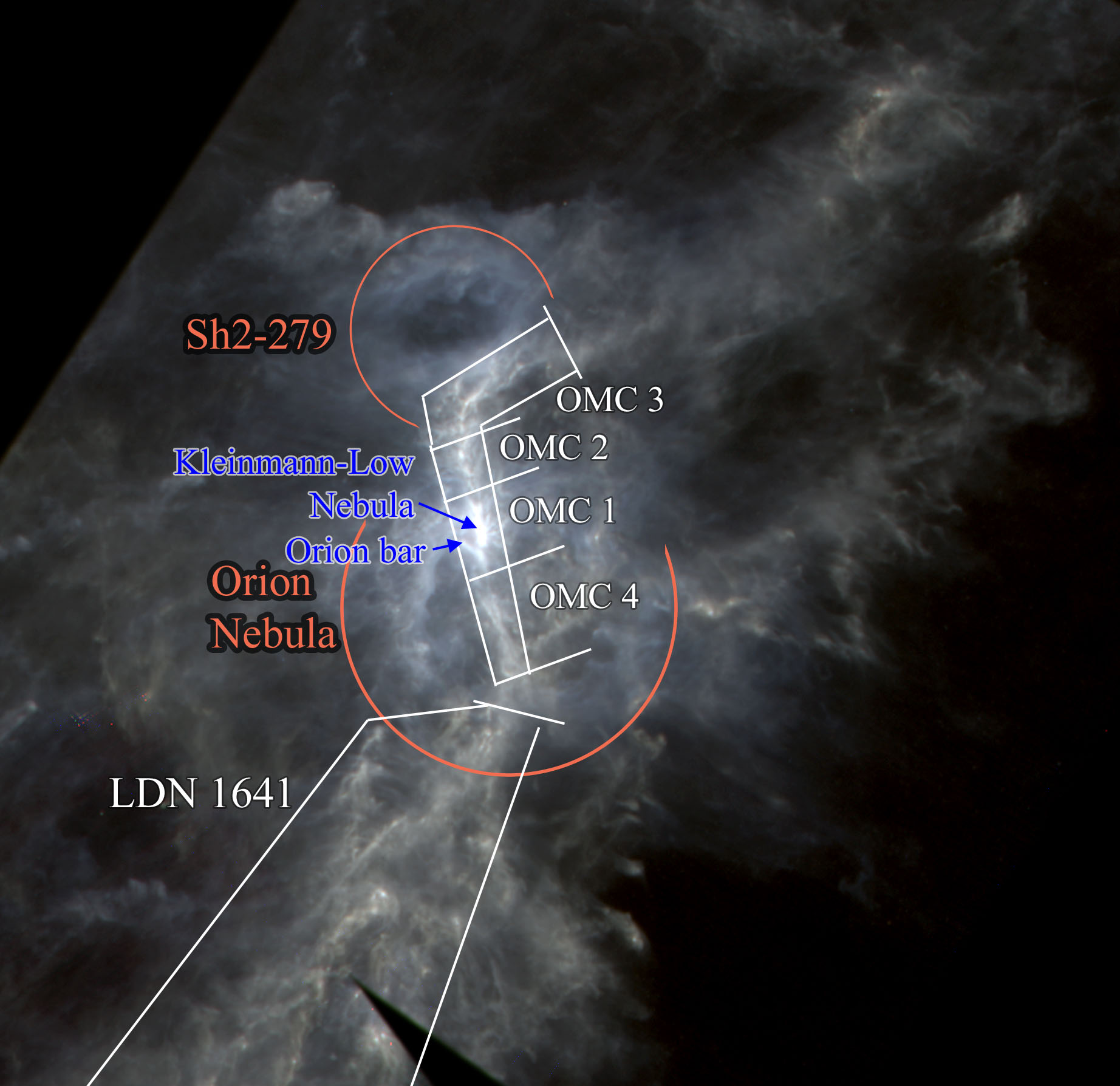
- ESA's Herschel Space Observatory did image the OMC in far-infrared

Observation data: J2000 epoch
- Class: star-forming region
- Right ascension: 05^{h} 35^{m} 27.0^{s}
- Declination: −05° 10′ 06″
- Distance: 1,280 ly (392 pc)
- Constellation: Orion
- Designations: OMC-1, OMC-2, OMC-3, OMC-4

The Orion Molecular Clouds (OMC) form collectively a filament cloud and are star-forming regions located behind the Orion Nebula and are seen as dark clouds between the Orion Nebula and Sh 2-279. The filament is part of the molecular cloud Orion A, which is part of the Orion molecular cloud complex. The Orion Molecular Clouds are divided into four parts: OMC-1, OMC-2, OMC-3 and OMC-4. Material in the OMCs and material in the foreground from the Orion Nebula prevent observations in shorter wavelengths and therefore the OMC is often observed with radio telescopes and with infrared telescopes.

== Orion Molecular Cloud 1 ==
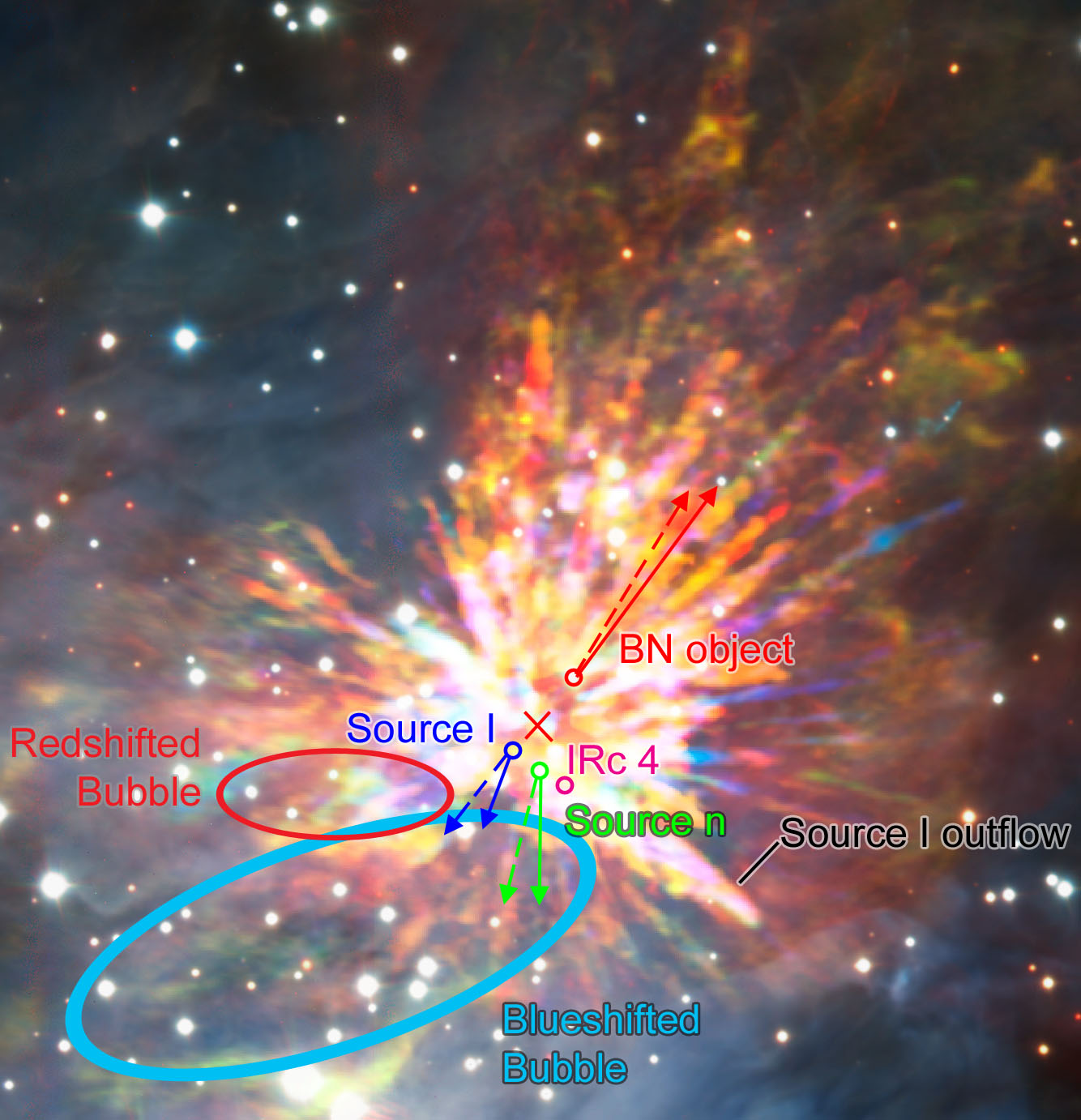
The Kleinmann-Low nebula and different ejected stars are the result of an explosion.

The OMC-1 is located behind the Orion Nebula. Most notable the OMC-1 contains the Kleinmann-Low nebula (KL nebula) in its center. While the KL nebula and the protostars in the core of OMC-1 are located only 90 arcseconds from the Trapezium cluster, the OMC-1 is actually a few tenths of a parsec behind the Trapezium cluster. The material of the OMC-1 shields the protostars from the intense radiation of the Trapezium cluster. Scientists used ALMA to image the disks around 51 sources in the OMC-1 and the study has shown that the disk size of these sources is similar to the disk sizes of protostars in the Orion Nebula Cluster. The KL nebula is the place of likely collision between two protostellar systems. The release of the gravitational energy and the possible merger of two stars released a large amount of energy, leading to the explosion remnant of the KL nebula with ejected material and the ejection of stars in different directions, most notably two massive protostars called the Becklin-Neugebauer object and the radio source I.

== Orion Molecular Cloud 2 ==
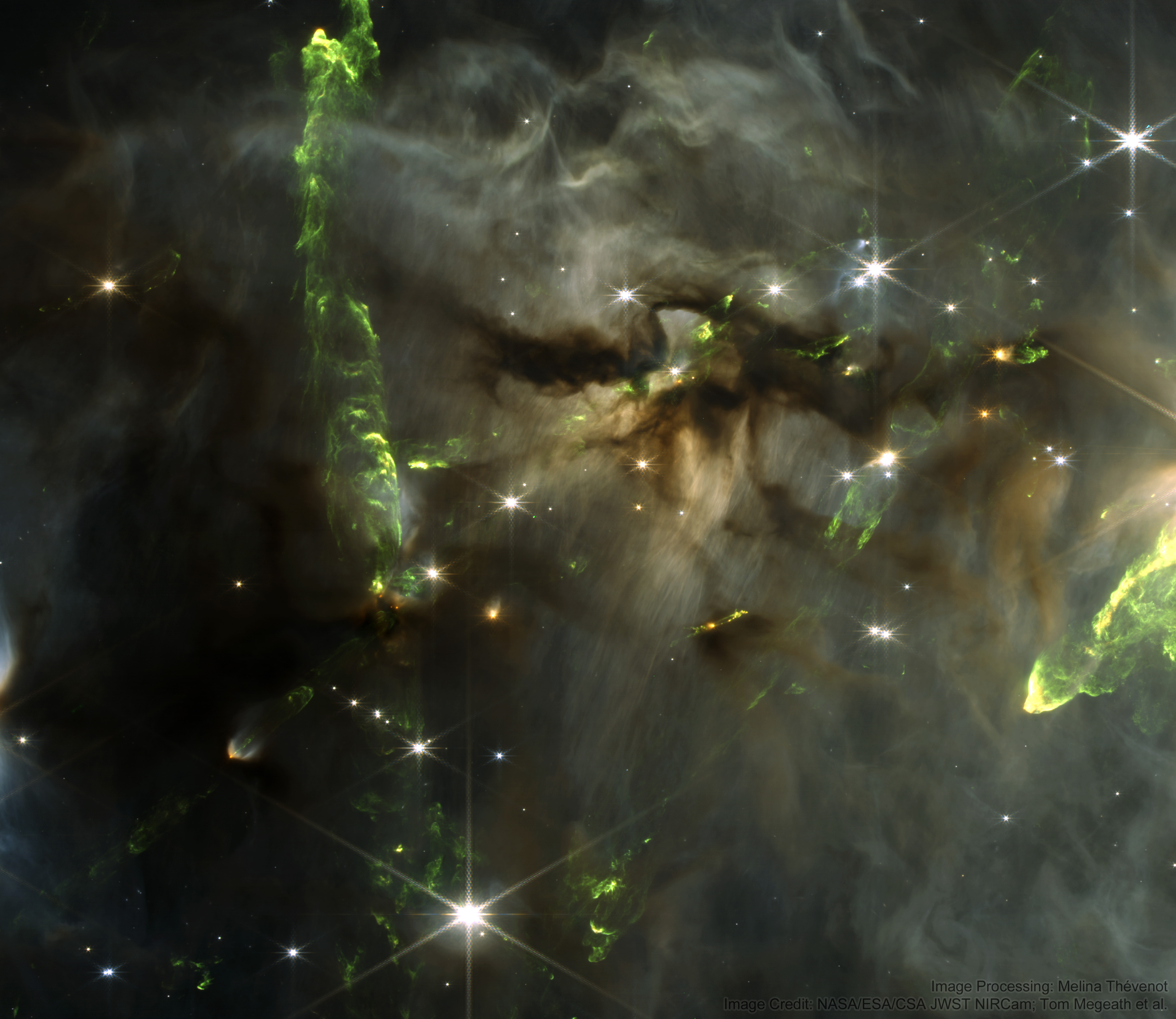
Part of the northern part of OMC-2 with JWST NIRCam, showing protostars and outflows.

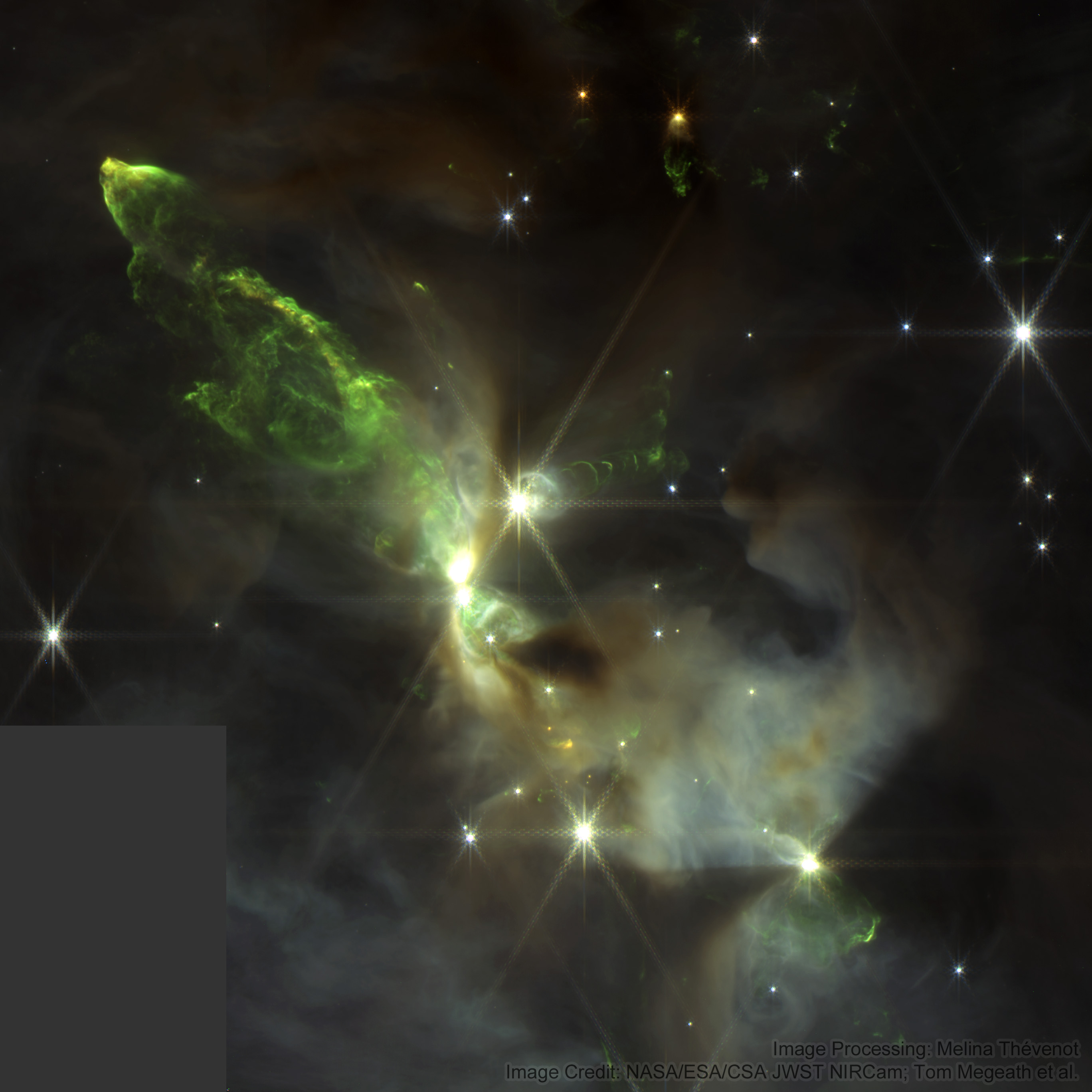
Part of the southern part of OMC-2 with NIRCam, showing most prominently the outflow from HOPS 370.

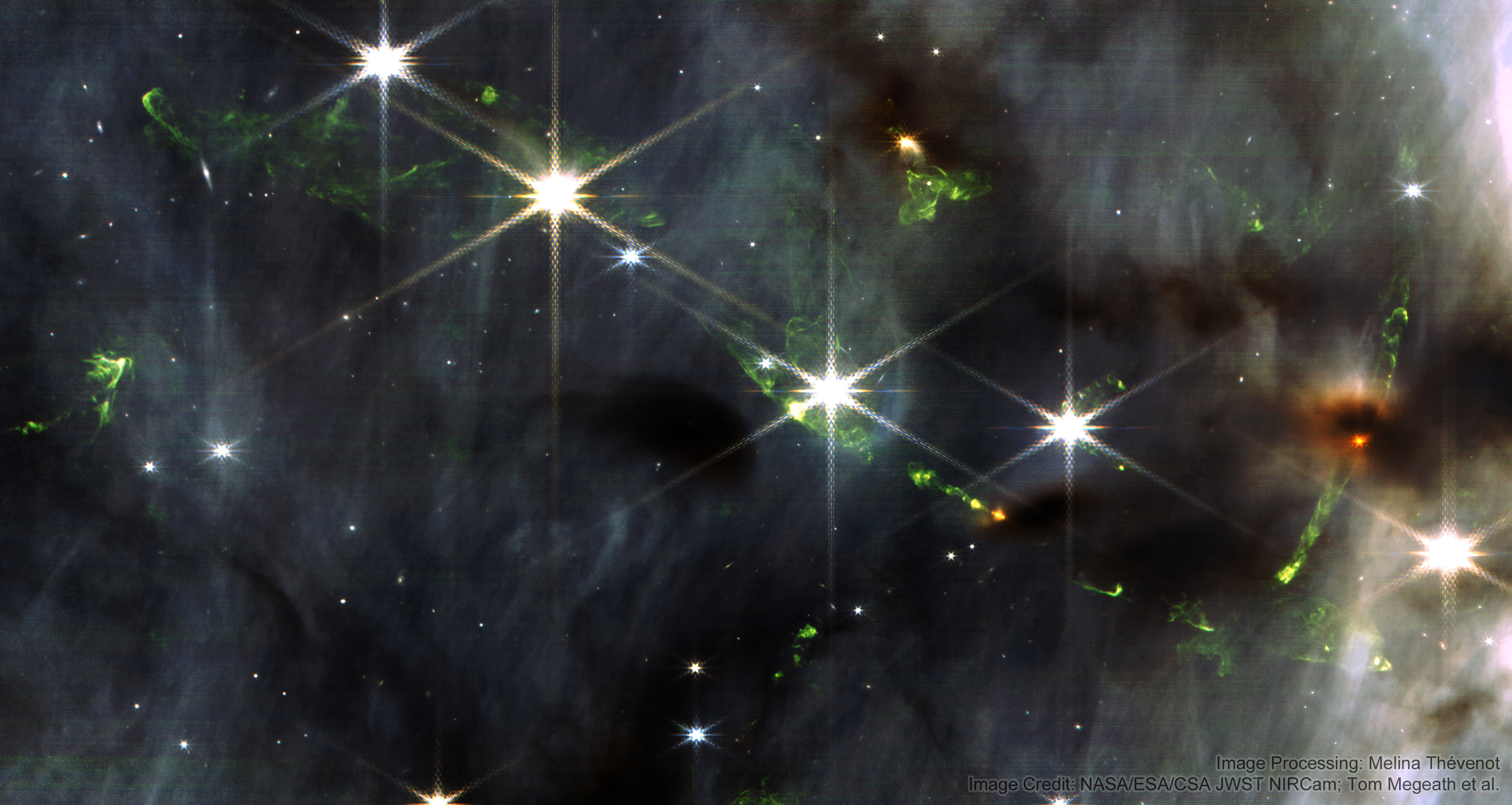
Part of OMC-3 with NIRCam.

OMC-2 is located north of OMC-1. It has multiple protostars. First discovered in 1990 the far-infrared sources FIR 1-6 are today associated with protostars. FIR 4 for example is associated with the class 0 protostar HOPS 108 and FIR 3 is the class I protostar HOPS 370, which launches a large outflow. HOPS 370 for example is an intermediate-massive protostar (~2.5 M_{☉}) that is well studied. It is surrounded by a near edge-on circumstellar disk, with a radius of around 100 astronomical units. Rotation of the disk was detected with the help of molecular emission lines.

== Orion Molecular Cloud 3 ==
OMC-3 is located north of OMC-1 in between the Orion Nebula and Sh 2-279. Unlike the other clouds it does not have a north-south orientation, but instead has an orientation that is more east-to-west. Prominent protostars are sources that were discovered in 1997 and are shortened to MMS 1–10 (Millimeter Source). MMS 1–7 are surrounded by disk-like structures and show carbon monoxide outflows.

== Orion Molecular Cloud 4 ==
OMC-4 is located to the south of OMC-1. It has a dominating strong magnetic field that is unfavourable for star formation and has fewer protostars than OMC-3. It appears more clumpy than the more filament-like OMC-3.

== See also ==
- LDN 1641 dark clouds that are also part of Orion A
- Orion molecular cloud complex is the large parent complex that the OMCs are part of.
