= HH 222 =

Herbig-Haro object in the constellation Orion

Nebula
- Herbig–Haro object
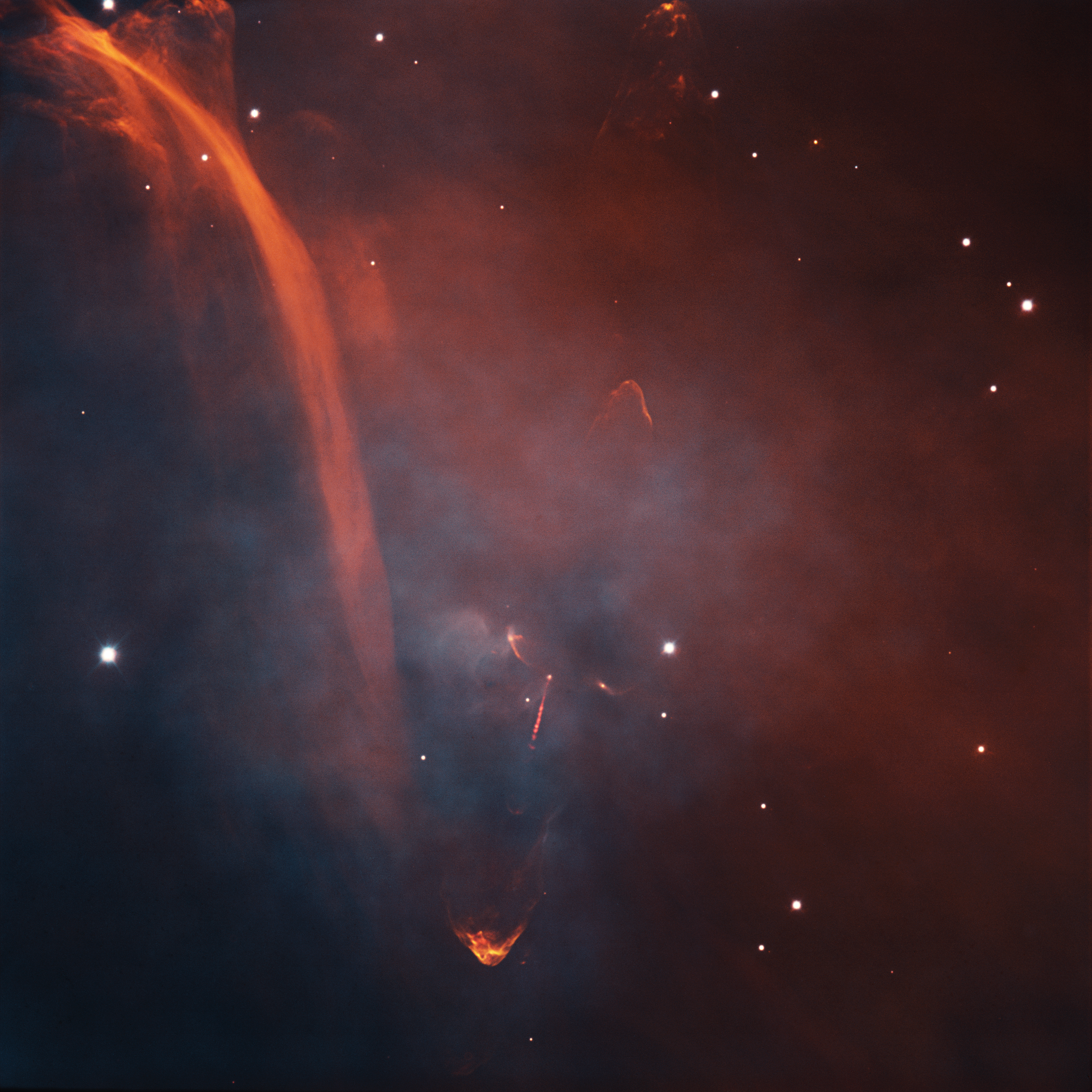
- European Southern Observatory image of HH 222

Observation data: J2000.0 epoch
- Right ascension: 05^{h} 35^{m} 41.00^{s}
- Declination: −06° 22′ 60.0″
- Distance: 1,500 ly
- Constellation: Orion
- Designations: HH 222

HH 222 (also known as the Waterfall Nebula and Orion Streamers) is a prominent Herbig–Haro object located in the Orion molecular cloud complex. It is characterized by its elongated, cascade-like structure resembling a flowing waterfall, formed by ionized gas streams interacting with surrounding molecular clouds.

== Structure ==
HH 222 is a giant, curved filament of shocked gas, stretching in a sinuous path that evokes the appearance of cascading water. The structure converges toward a bright, non-thermal radio source in its upper left region, with fainter parallel streams enhancing the waterfall illusion. Spectroscopic analysis reveals high-velocity outflows, indicative of shock fronts where material reaches speeds of hundreds of km/s.

The nebula is embedded in a dusty environment, with the surrounding L1641 cloud obscuring parts of its extent in optical wavelengths. Infrared and radio observations have been crucial for mapping its full morphology and kinematics.

== Formation ==
HH 222 is classified as a giant Herbig–Haro flow, arising from collimated outflows ejected by young, low-mass stars during their protostellar phase. Detailed studies in 2013 identified its origin in the quadruple star system V380 Orionis, a multiple system of young stars approximately 0.3 parsecs from the nebula's head.
