= Deuterated methanol =

Chemical compound

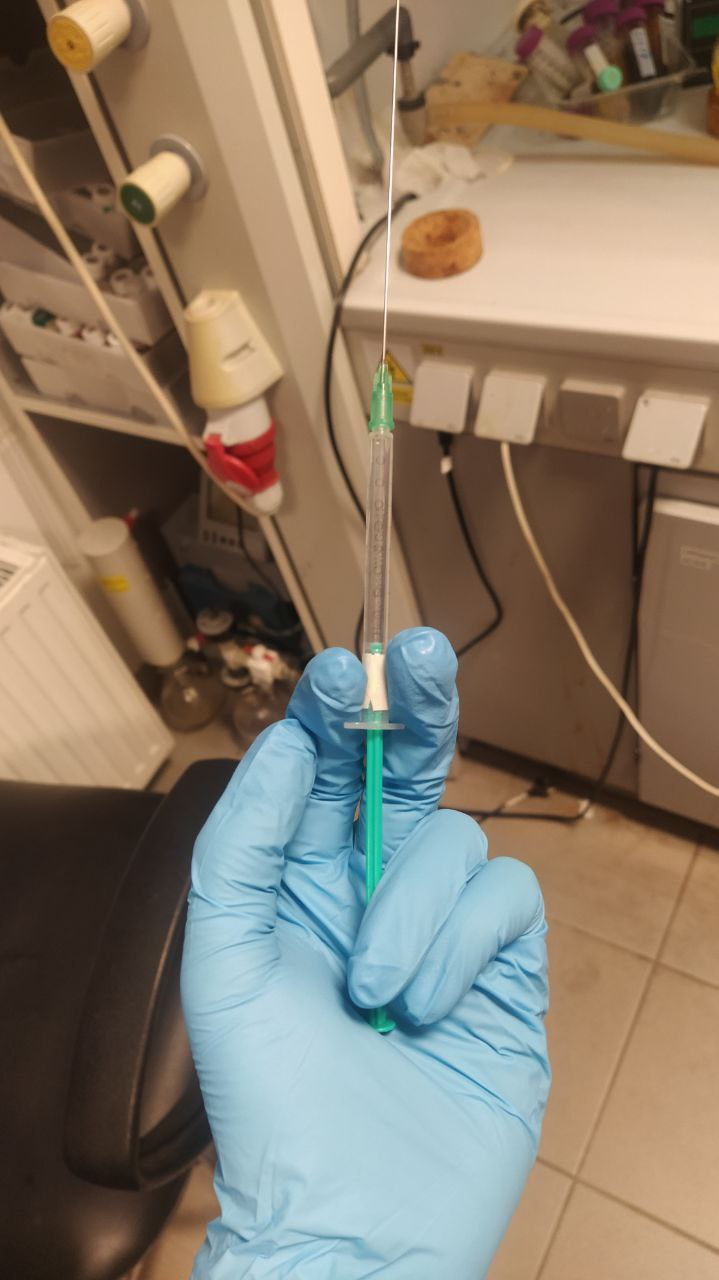

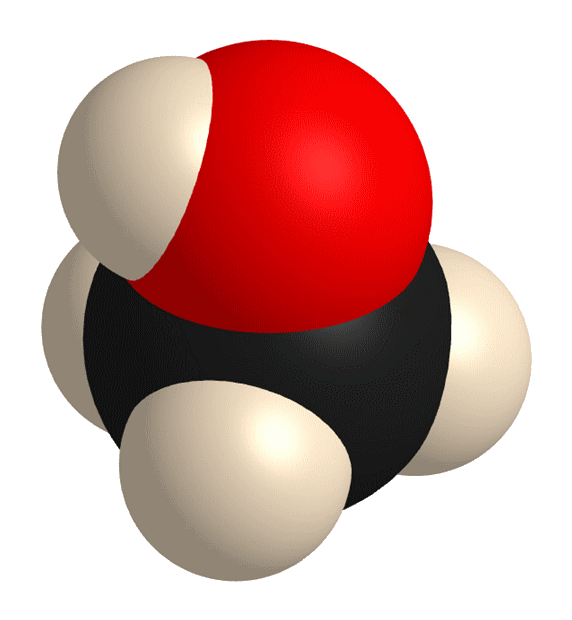

Names
- Preferred IUPAC name (^{2}H_{3})Methan(^{2}H)ol

Identifiers
CAS Number	811-98-3
3D model (JSmol)	Interactive image
Beilstein Reference	1733278
ChEBI	CHEBI:156265
ChemSpider	64640
ECHA InfoCard	100.011.253
EC Number	212-378-6
PubChem CID	71568
UN number	1230
CompTox Dashboard (EPA)	DTXSID801010038
- InChI: InChI=1S/CH4O/c1-2/h2H,1H3/i1D3,2D Key: OKKJLVBELUTLKV-MZCSYVLQSA-N
- SMILES: [2H]OC([2H])([2H])[2H]

Properties
Chemical formula	CD_{4}O
Molar mass	36.0665 g·mol^{−1}
Density	0.888 g/cm^{−3}
Melting point	−98 °C (−144 °F; 175 K)
Boiling point	65 °C (149 °F; 338 K)

Thermochemistry
Heat capacity (C)	87.9 J K^{−1} mol^{−1}

Hazards
- GHS labelling
Pictograms	(GHS02: Flammable) (GHS06: Toxic) (GHS08: Health hazard)
Signal word	Warning
Hazard statements	H225, H301, H311, H331, H370
Precautionary statements	P210, P233, P240, P241, P242, P243, P260, P264, P270, P271, P280, P301+P310, P302+P352, P303+P361+P353, P304+P340, P307+P311, P311, P312, P321, P322, P330, P361, P363, P370+P378, P403+P233, P403+P235, P405, P501
Flash point	11 °C (52 °F; 284 K)

Related compounds
Related compounds	Methanol
- Except where otherwise noted, data are given for materials in their standard state (at 25 °C [77 °F], 100 kPa). Infobox references

Deuterated methanol (CD_{3}OD) is a form (called an isotopologue) of methanol (CH_{3}OH) in which the hydrogen atoms ("H") are replaced with deuterium (heavy hydrogen) isotope ("D"). Deuterated methanol is a common solvent used in NMR spectroscopy.

Deuterated methanol was first detected in interstellar space in the Kleinmann–Low Nebula in 1988 by scientists at the Max Planck Institute for Radio Astronomy.
