= HH 111 =

Herbig–Haro object in Orion

Emission nebula
- Herbig–Haro object
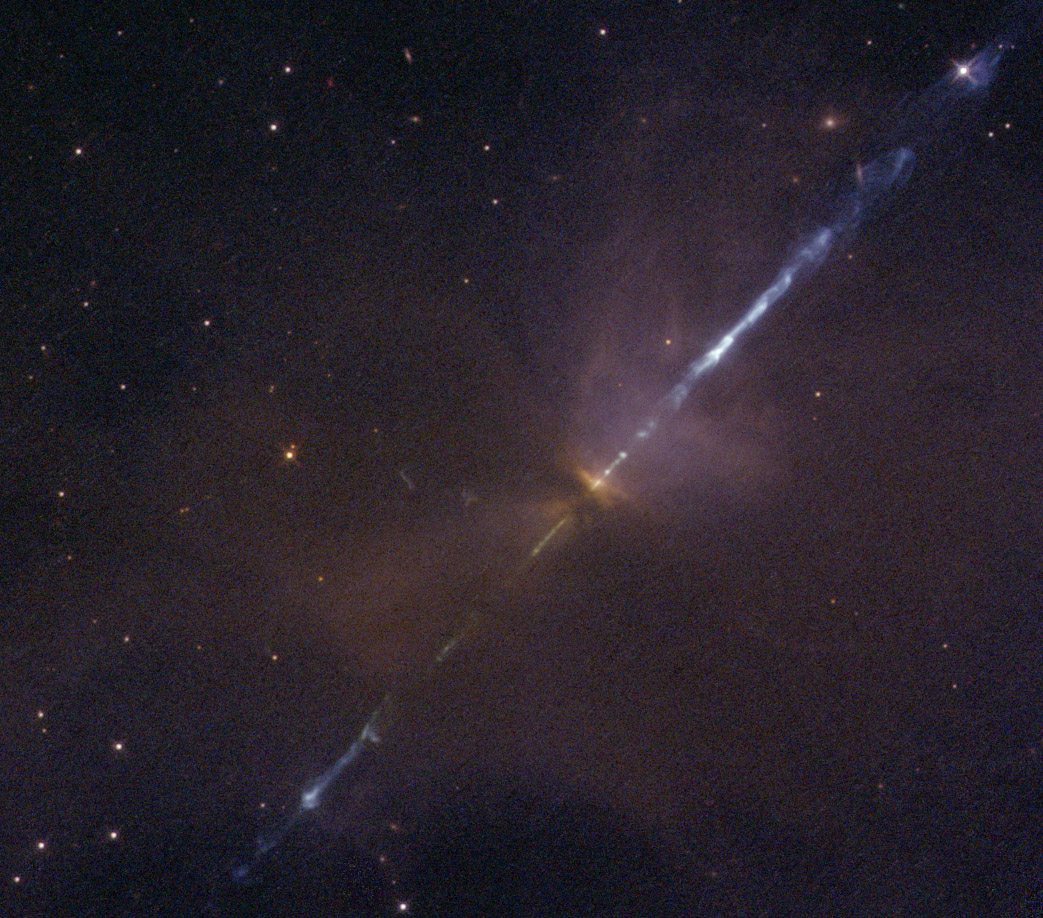
- Hubble WFC3 image of HH 111

Observation data: J2000.0 epoch
- Right ascension: 05^{h} 51^{m} 44.2^{s}
- Declination: +02° 48′ 34″
- Distance: 1500 ly
- Constellation: Orion
- Designations: HH 111

HH 111 is a Herbig–Haro object in the L1617 dark cloud of the Orion B molecular cloud in the constellation of Orion. It is a prototype of a highly collimated optical jet sources. It shows several bow shocks and has a length of about 2.6 light-years (0.8 parsec).

HH 111 is about 1300 light years (400 parsec) distant from earth and the central source is IRAS 05491+0247, also called VLA 1. This source is the driving source of the jets and it is a class I protostar with a luminosity of about 25 L_{☉}. This protostar is embedded in a 30 M_{☉} cloud core. The dynamical age of the complex is only 800 years. Near the central source an ammonia feature called NH_{3}-S was found, which is a starless core with a turbulent interior induced by HH 111.

The jets move with a speed of 300–600 km/s and consist of a blueshifted component, which is bright in optical wavelengths and a redshifted faint counterjet. A second pair of bipolar jets, called HH 121, was discovered in the near-infrared at an angle of 61° compared to the HH 111 pair. This was taken as evidence for a system with multiple protostars.

== Gallery ==
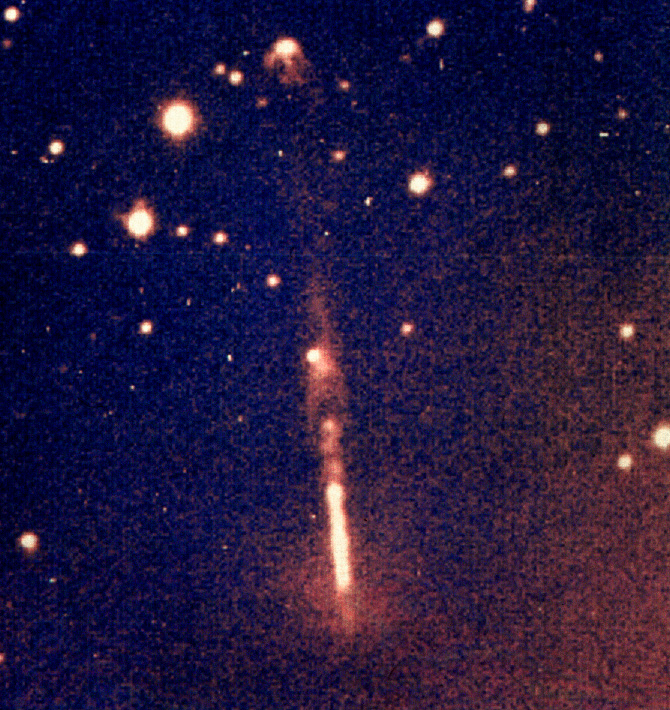
The bright blueshifted jet of HH 111 seen by the ground-based telescope NTT

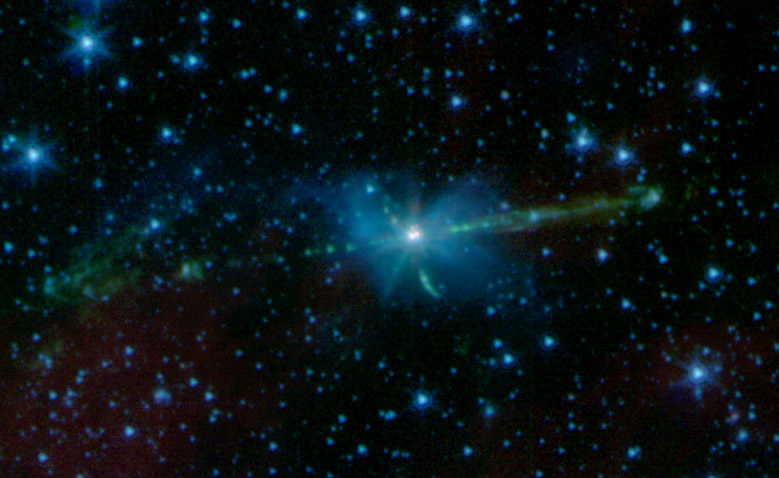
HH 111 seen by the Spitzer Space Telescope in infrared, showing also HH 121

Animation of HH 111 (Hubble image), showing the movement of the jet and bow shock
