= Eridanus Loop =

Nebula
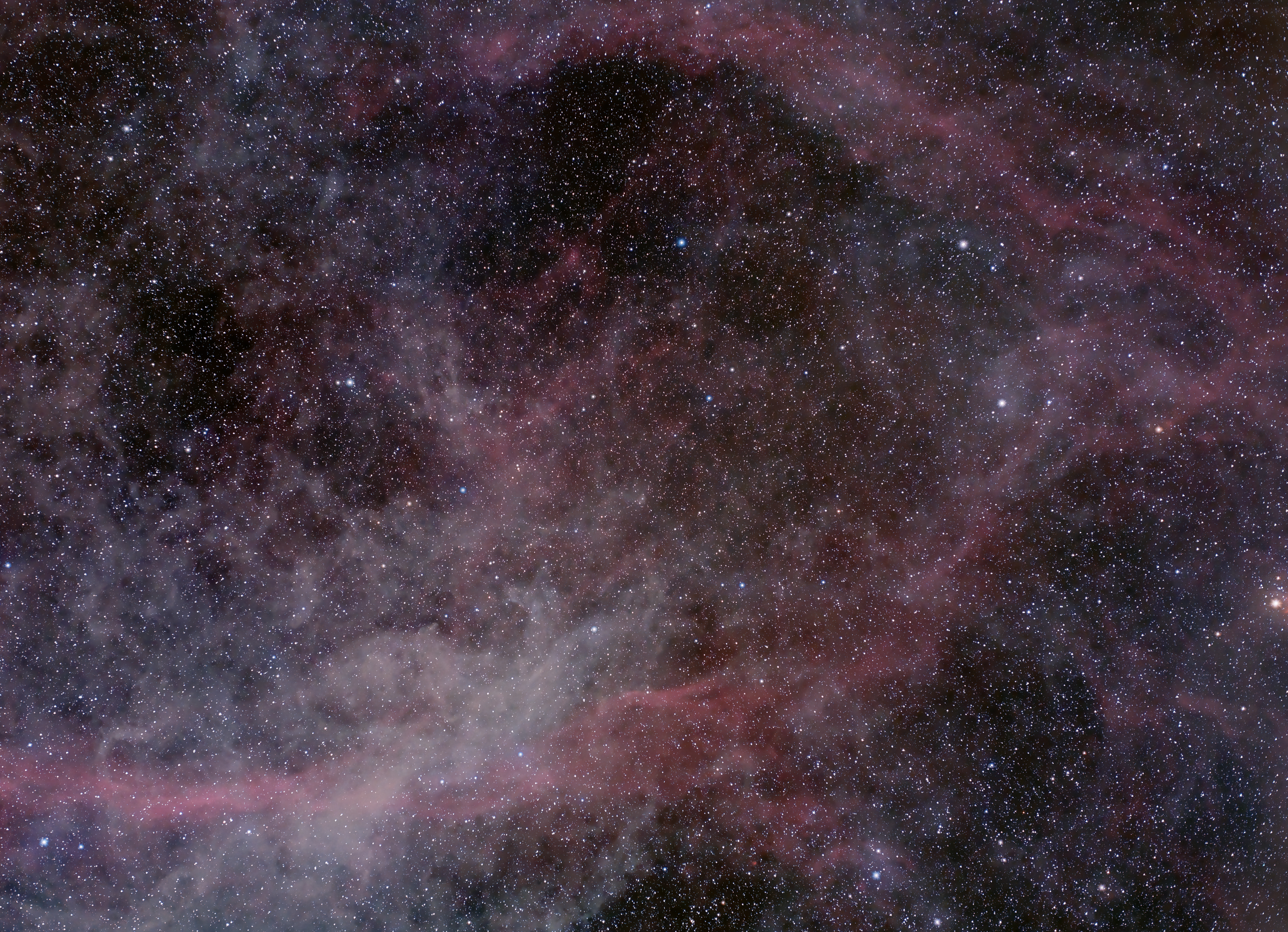
- Image of Sh 2-245

Observation data: J2000.0 epoch
- Right ascension: 04^{h} 01^{m} 20.53^{s}
- Declination: +03° 13′ 29.0″
- Distance: 680 ly
- Constellation: Taurus
- Designations: Sh 2-245, LBN 839

The Eridanus Loop (also known as Sh 2-245 and Fishhook Nebula) is a large faint emission nebula and a potential supernova remnant (SNR) located primarily in the constellations of Taurus and extending into northern Eridanus. It is one of the largest nebulae in apparent angular size within the Sharpless catalog of H II regions.It is part of the Orion–Eridanus Superbubble, a vast superbubble in the constellations of Orion. It forms the fainter counterpart to the more prominent Barnard's Loop on the eastern side.

== Characteristics ==
At a distance of approximately 210 parsecs (about 685 light-years), Sh 2-245 is relatively nearby and lies within the Local Arm of the Milky Way. It is suspected to be either an ancient supernova remnant or a superbubble shell formed by multiple stellar outflows interacting with the interstellar medium, potentially connecting to the more prominent Barnard's Loop in Orion to the east. The structure encloses a low-density cavity and is associated with other Sharpless objects, such as Sh 2-241 and Sh 2-264, contributing to the overall Orion-Eridanus Superbubble complex.
