= Kleinmann–Low Nebula =

Nebula in Orion

Nebula
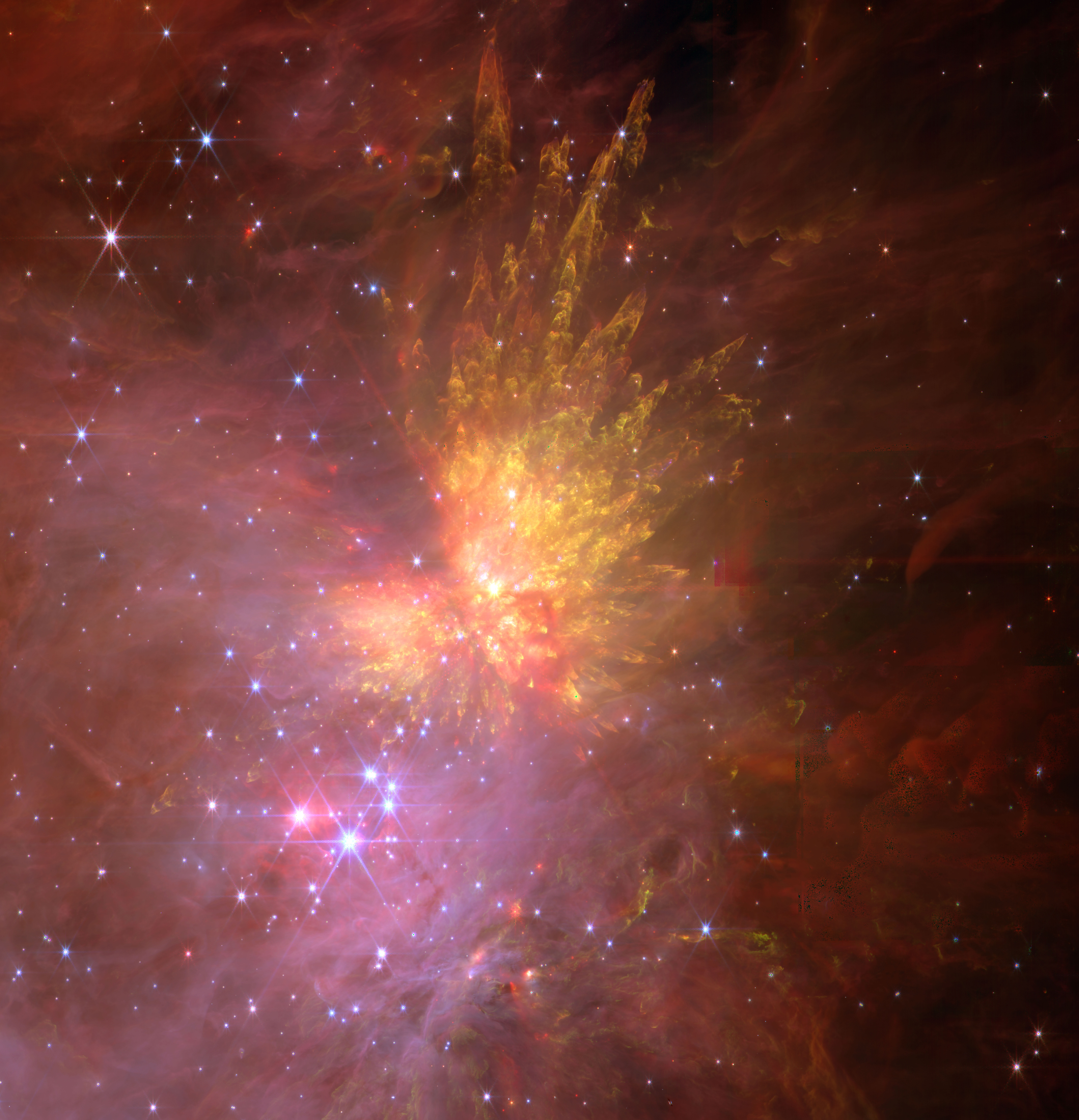
- Kleinmann–Low Nebula with JWST

Observation data: J2000 epoch
- Right ascension: 05^{h} 35^{m} 14.16^{s}
- Declination: −05° 22′ 21.5″
- Constellation: Orion

The Kleinmann–Low Nebula (also known as the Orion KL Nebula) is an active star forming region and place of a past explosion event in the Milky Way galaxy. It is a cluster of stars within a molecular cloud.

The Kleinmann–Low Nebula is at the heart of the Orion Nebula, and is the most active star-forming region in it. Because of the thick dust surrounding it, it is observed primarily with infrared light, since visible light cannot pass through it. Hot stellar winds circulate off large, young, stars in Orion's nebula and heat the surrounding gas. This then causes an explosion that has a finger-like intrusion look. It is named after Douglas Kleinmann and Frank J. Low, who discovered the nebula in 1967. Between 1972 and 1973 a large amount of maps were secured with the Steward and Catalina Observatories telescopes.

The luminosity of the Kleinmann–Low Nebula is approximately 3.828×10^{31} W, or roughly 10^{5} times that of the sun, making the nebula the brightest component of the OMC-1 Complex. The temperature of the dust surrounding the Kleinmann–Low Nebula calculated to be approximately 70 Kelvin. The nebula is estimated to be rather cool at less than 600 Kelvin, yet extremely active when viewed in the far infrared range. Inside of the nebula, the brightest object observed is the Becklin-Neugebauer Object (BN object).

The Kleinmann–Low nebula is rich in the molecules HCOOCH_{3}, CH_{3}OCH_{3} and deuterated methanol, and abundant with nascent stars and planetary systems.

== Past explosion ==
A remnant of an explosion is called BN-KL complex or BN-KL region. The BN object and radio source I are moving away from the center of a past explosion that took place around 550 years ago. The nebula shows so-called iron "bullets" and molecular hydrogen "fingers" that trace the wake of these bullets. These "fingers" overlap with carbon monoxide streamers from ALMA observations, which move with up to 100 km/s. The explosion was on the scale of a nova or supernova that was caused by the interaction of multiple stars. The energy for the explosion was provided by the release of gravitational binding energy and possibly the merger of two stars, most likely radio source I. JWST NIRCam also observed the explosion remnant, mapping both iron "bullets" and hydrogen "fingers" in more detail. Material ejected from the explosion include the Herbig-Haro object HH 210, which is bursting out of the BN-KL complex. HH 210 is moving with 425 km/s and is the only bullet that was detected in soft x-rays with Chandra.

== Gallery ==
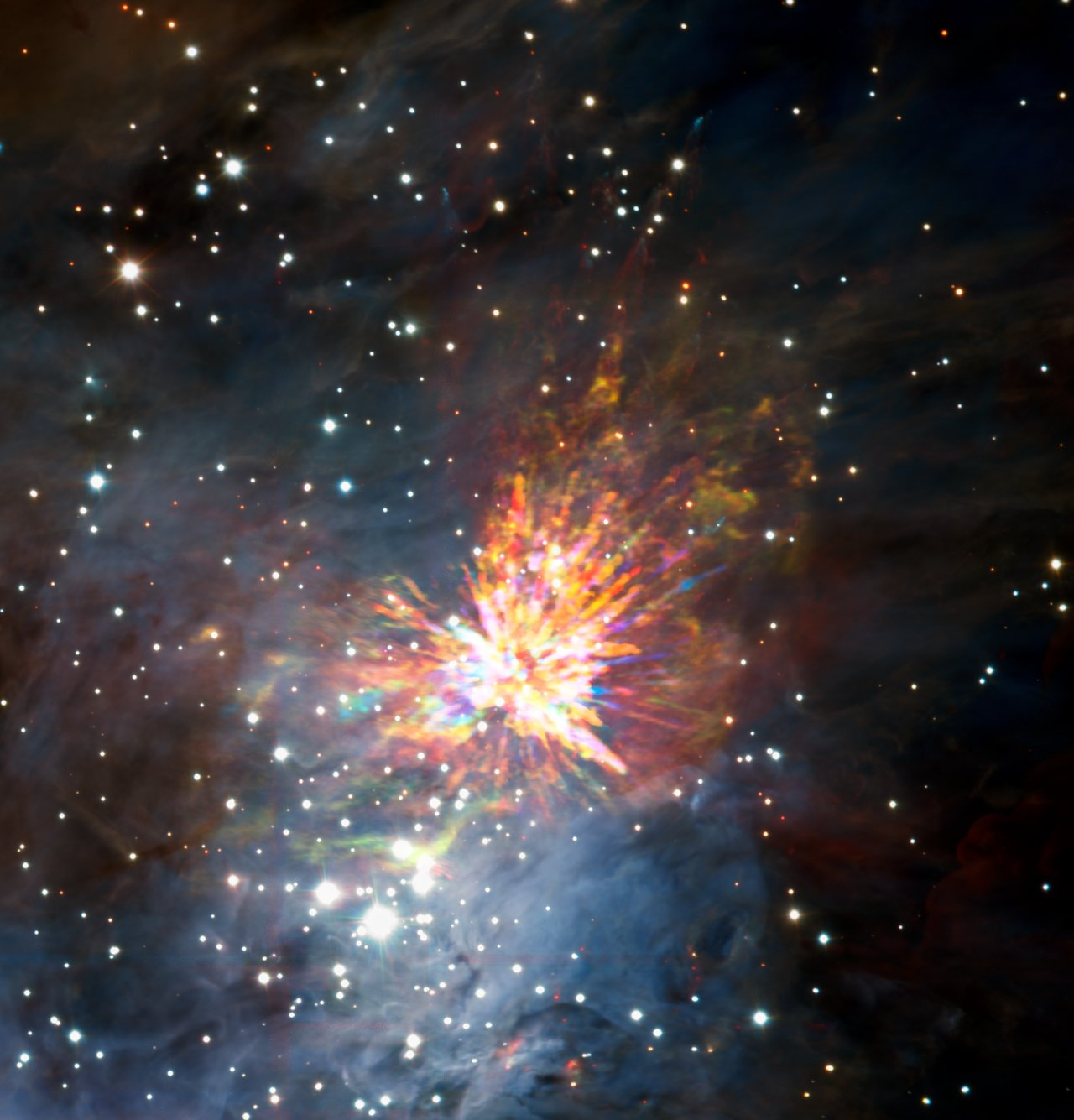
Complete view of the ALMA, Gemini and VLT image showing the explosion remnant. The stars in the lower-left are the Trapezium cluster.

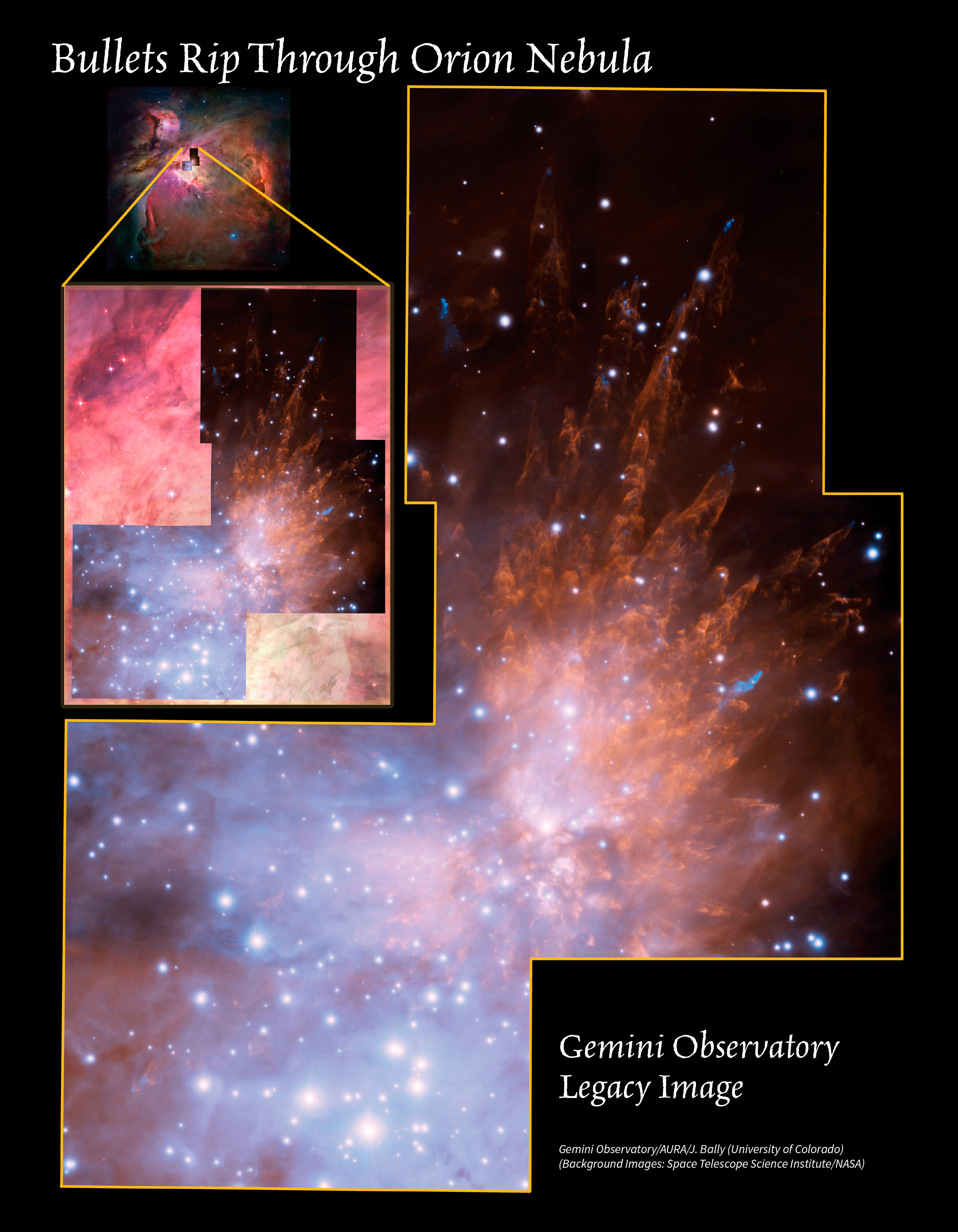
Complete image of the Gemini Observatory observation of the Kleinmann-Low nebula.

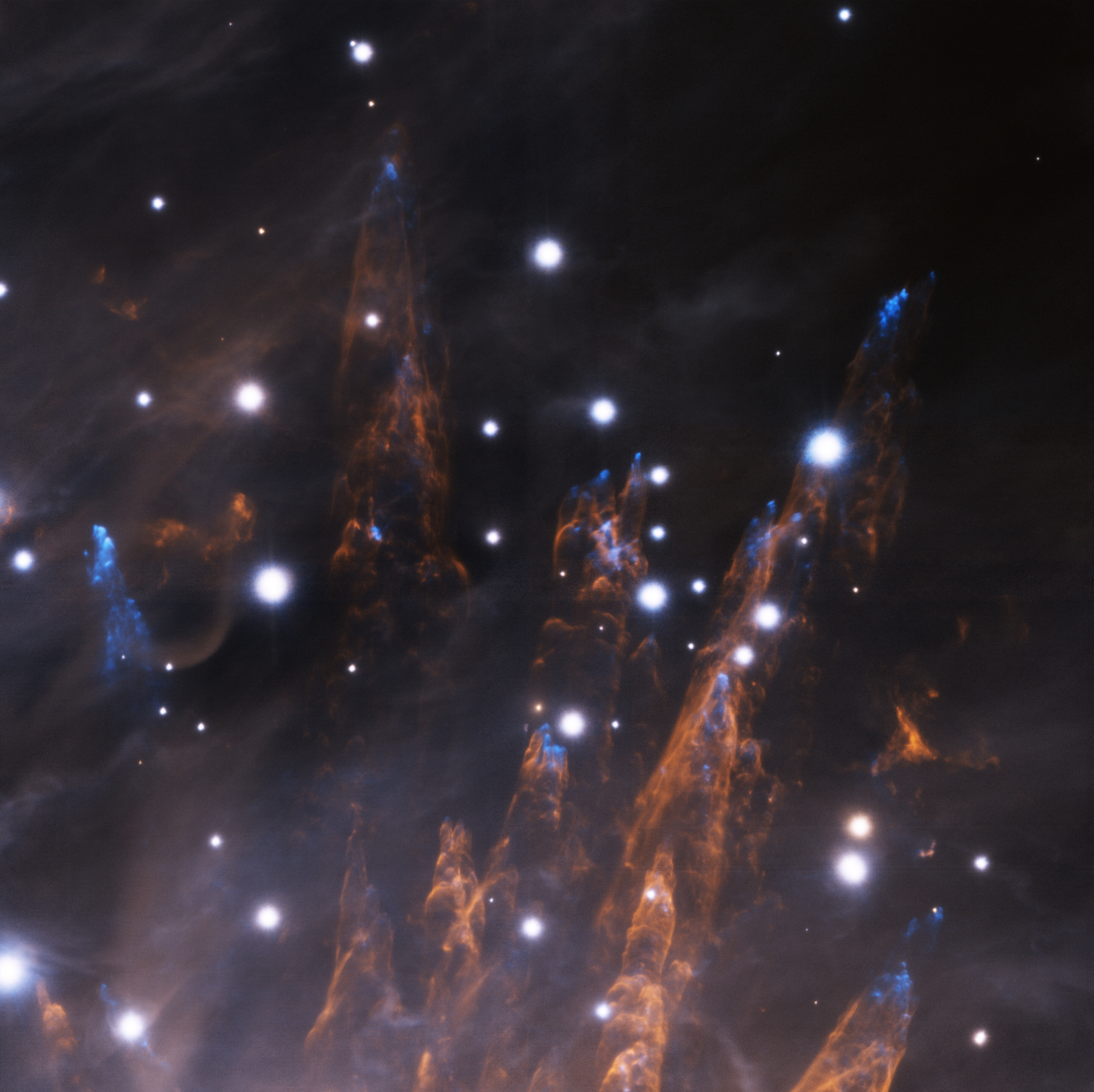
Part of the explosion (fingers) in the northern/northwestern part with Gemini. Iron is blue and molecular hydrogen is orange in this image. The ejecta on the left only seen in blue is HH 210.

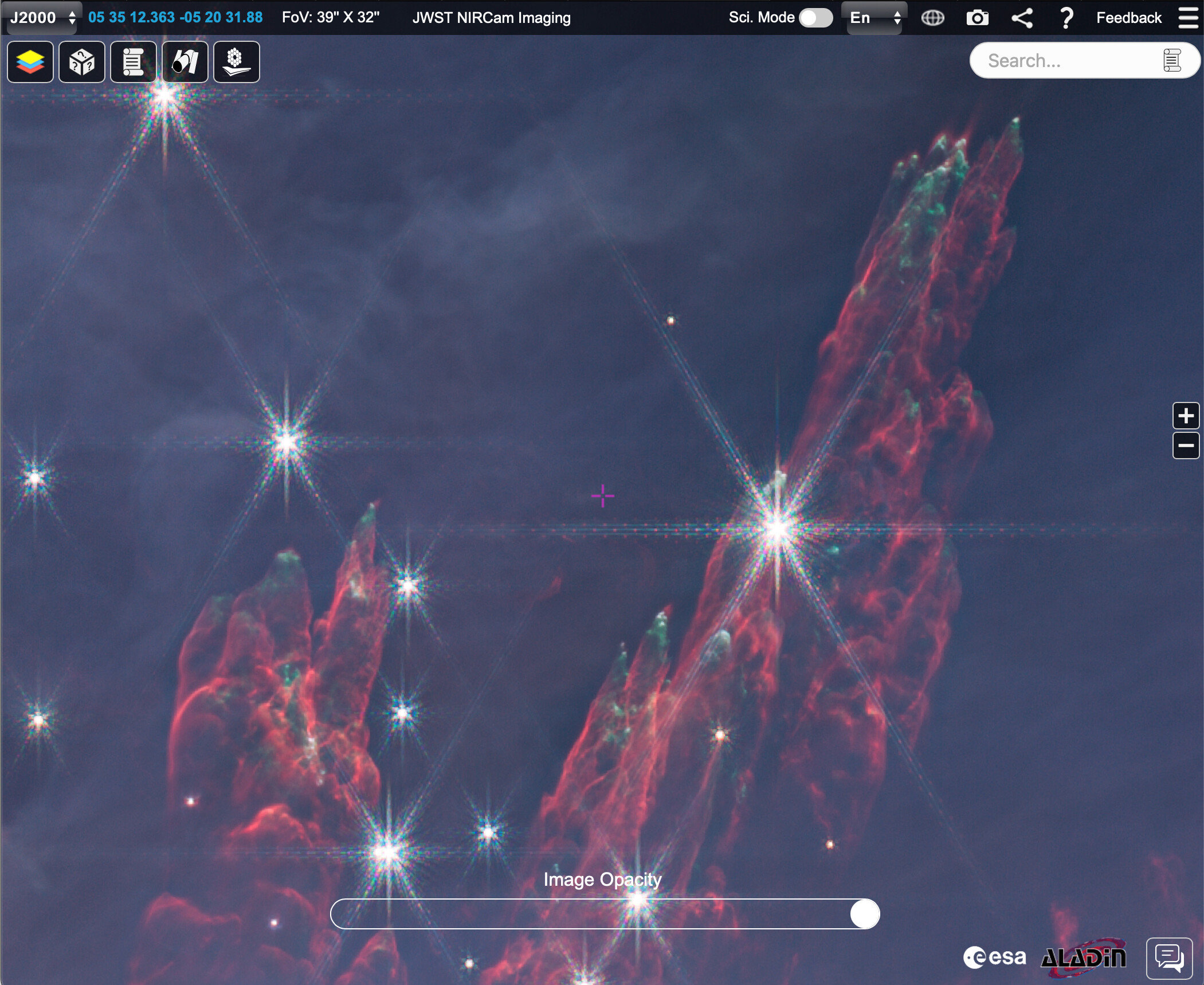
Part of the explosion with JWST NIRCam. Iron is green and the fingers in hydrogen are red.

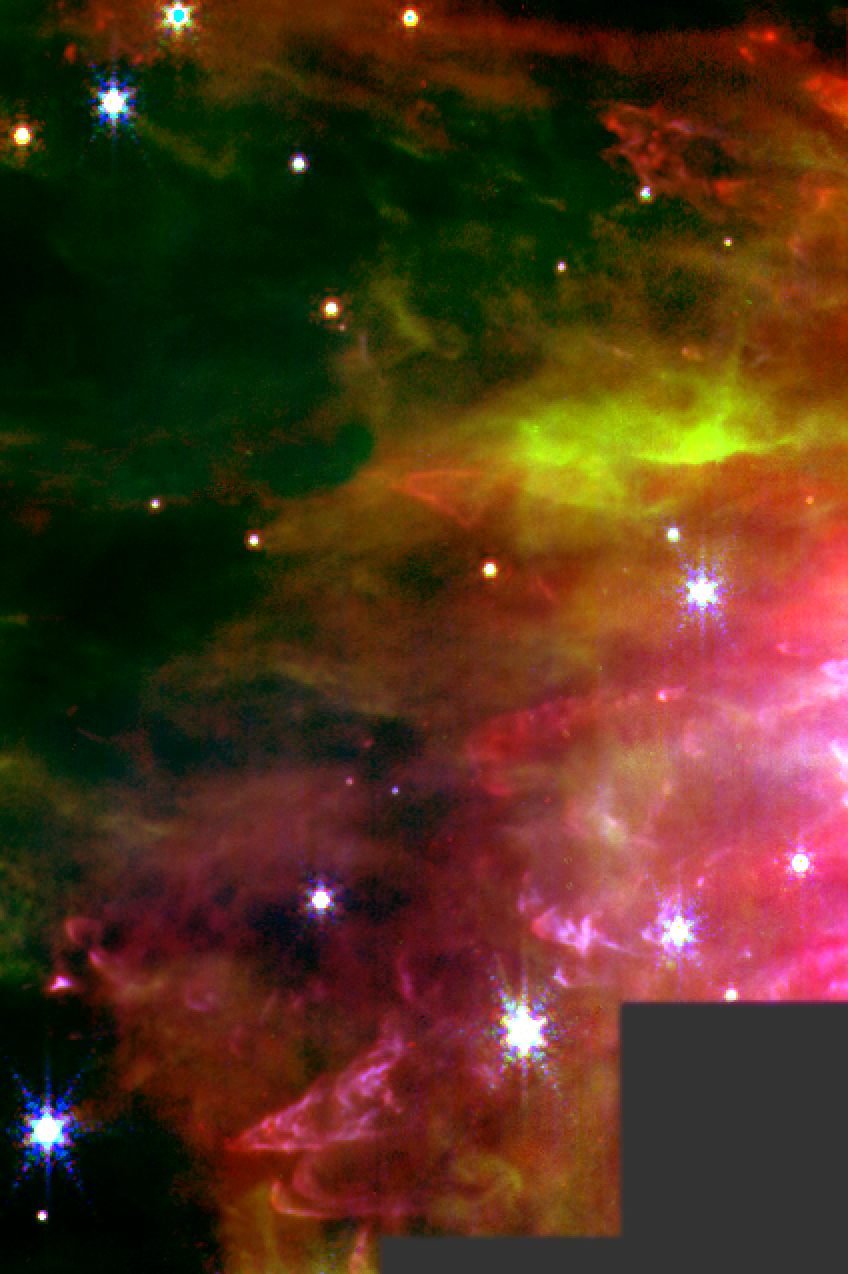
Eastern segment of the fingers imaged by JWST NIRCam.

== Bibliography ==
- Ferland G. J. Osterbrock Donald E. (2005) Astrophysics of gaseous nebulae and active galactic nuclei University Science Books ISBN 978-1-891389-34-4
