= LDN 1641 =

Dark Nebula in the constellation Orion

Molecular cloud
- dark nebula
- Lynds 1641 (below the Orion Nebula) seen by the Atacama Pathfinder Experiment and DSS2

Observation data: J2000.0 epoch
- Right ascension: 05^{h} 39^{m} 00.0^{s}
- Declination: −07° 00′ 00″
- Distance: 1249-1477 ly (383-453 pc)
- Constellation: Orion (constellation)
- Designations: Lynds 1641

LDN 1641 or Lynds 1641 is a dark cloud in the constellation Orion. It encompasses a large part of the Orion A molecular cloud in the Orion molecular cloud complex, which is the closest giant molecular cloud to earth. At its northern end it is connected to the Orion Nebula and at its southern end it is connected to the dark cloud LDN 1647. LDN 1641 contains more than a thousand young stellar objects (YSOs). It is a relative low density star-forming region without any massive O- or B-type stars that could disturb the formation of young stars with their ultraviolet radiation. This means that researchers can study star formation that is happening in a very different environment when compared to the Orion Nebula.

Star-formation began in Lynds 1641 about 2-3 million years ago. About 50% of the YSOs in Lynds 1641 have circumstellar disks of which many were directly imaged with ALMA. The YSOs have a large fraction (21%) of so-called transitional disks, which are disks with a gap. Many of the directly imaged disks of other stars appearing in news coverage are in much closer star-forming regions, such as the Scorpius-Centaurus association. The disks will appear much smaller in ALMA images because of the 4 times larger distance compared to such a region.

Lynds 1641 has a strong distance gradient. The southern part of the cloud lies at around 428±10 parsec and the Orion Nebula lies at 388±5 parsecs according to VLBA observations. Gaia data has shown that the stars of Orion A follow a trend towards a closer distance at the northern part of the dark cloud. A distance of about 453 parsecs for the southern end of LDN 1641 and a distance of about 383 parsecs at the northern end of LDN 1641 was measured with Gaia.

Other nebulae overlap with Lynds 1641 and are associated with it, such as NGC 1999, IC 427/428, IC 429/430, HH34 and HH 1/2.

== Gallery ==
LDN 1641 imaged by the Euclid Space Telescope

Orion Nebula (top bright cloud) and Lynds 1641 (bottom dark clouds) with the Digitized Sky Survey 2

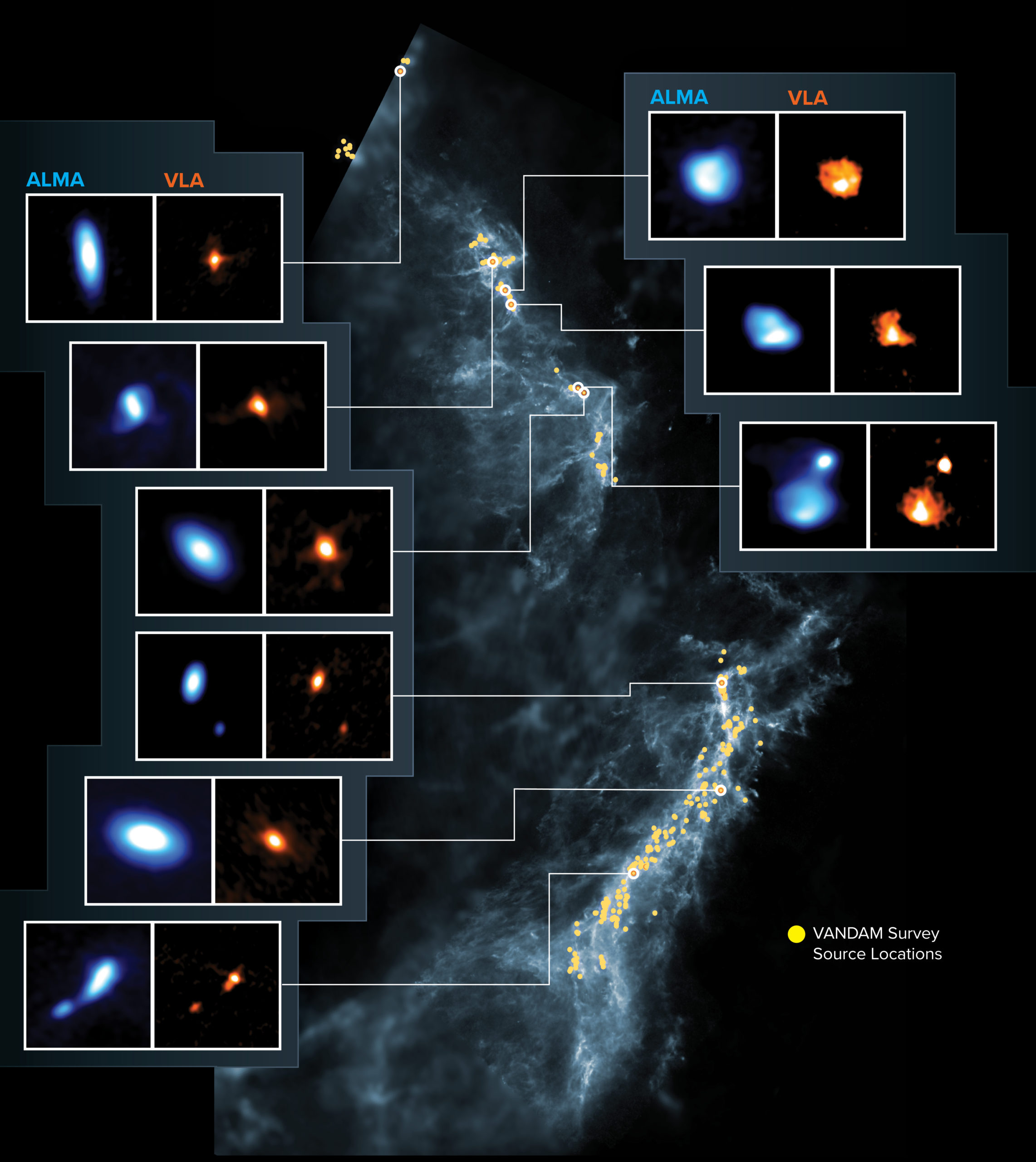
Orion A (bottom) with Herschel. Yellow points of the bottom cloud show the position of young stellar objects in Lynds 1641. The bottom three disks are in Lynds 1641.

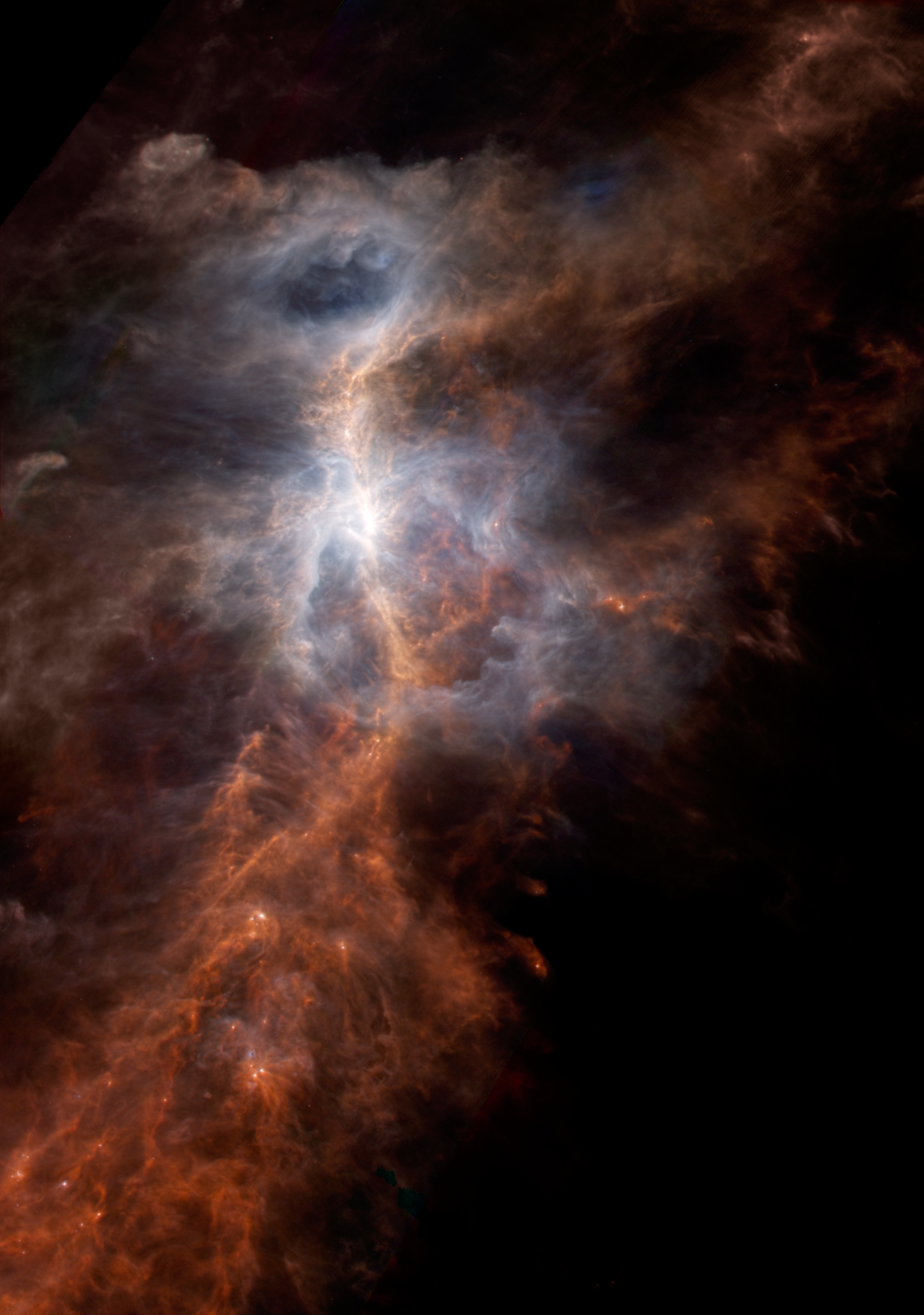
Herschel Space Observatory image of Lynds 1641 (orange) and the Orion Nebula (middle circle, white) and Sh2-279 (top circle, white).
