= HH 1/2 =

Herbig-Haro object in the constellation Orion

Emission nebula
- Herbig–Haro object
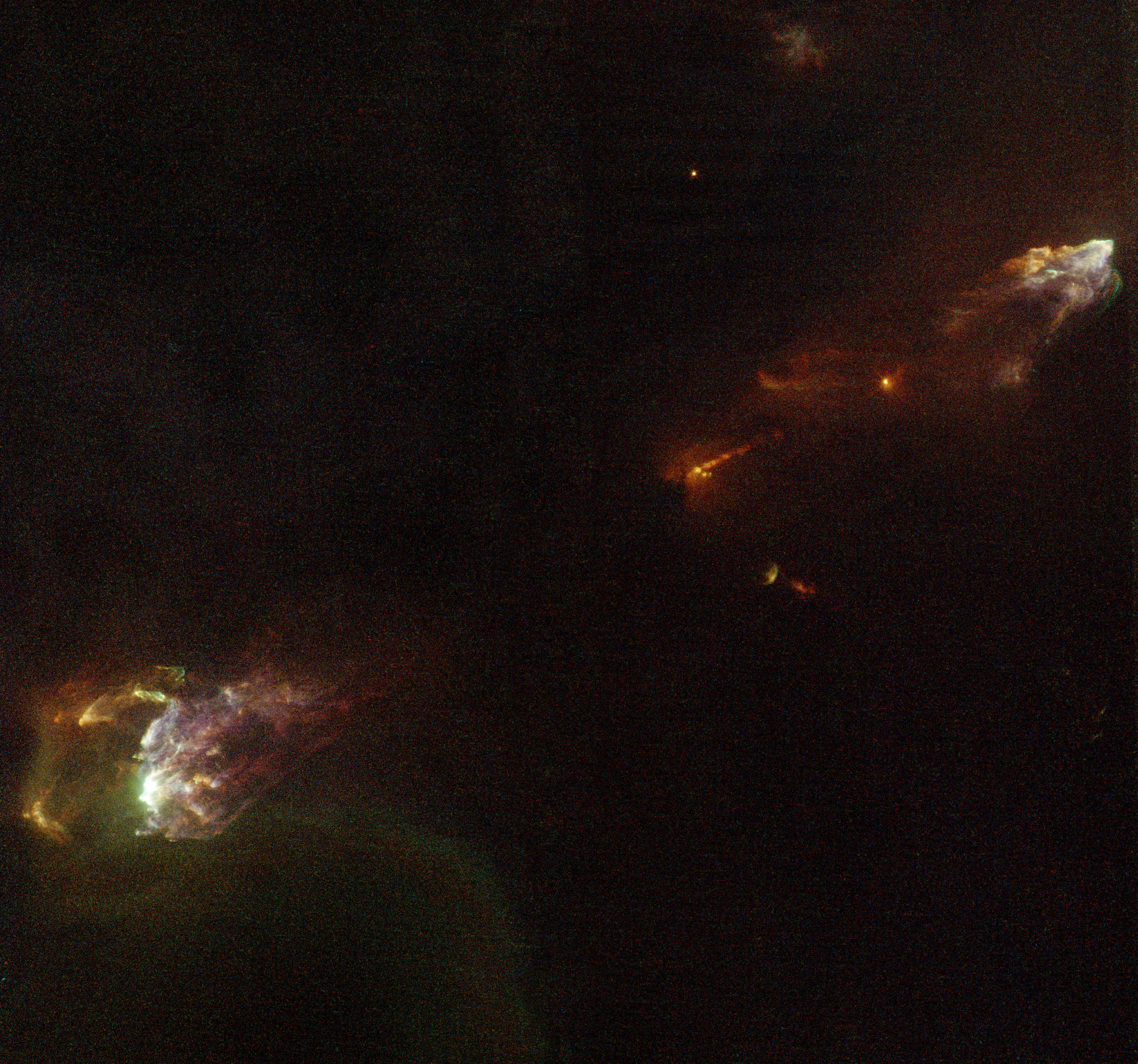
- Hubble Space Telescope WFC3 image of HH 1/2 and the jet pointing to HH 1 (right)

Observation data: J2000.0 epoch
- Right ascension: 05^{h} 36^{m} 22.8^{s}
- Declination: −06° 46′ 03″
- Distance: 1500 ly
- Constellation: Orion
- Designations: HH 1-2, HH 1/2, HH 1, HH 2

The Herbig-Haro objects HH 1/2 are the first such objects to be recognized as Herbig-Haro objects and were discovered by George Herbig and Guillermo Haro. They are located at a distance of about 1343 light-years (412 parsec) in the constellation Orion near NGC 1999. HH 1/2 are among the brightest Herbig-Haro objects in the sky and consist of a pair of oppositely oriented bow shocks, separated by 2.5 arcminutes (a projected separation of about 1.1 light year). The HH 1/2 pair were the first Herbig-Haro objects with detected proper motion and HH 2 was the first Herbig-Haro object to be detected in x-rays. Some of the structures in the Herbig-Haro Objects move with a speed of 400 km/s.

== The central region ==
The central region contains an opaque cloud core with an astrophysical jet and a highly embedded multiple-star system that remains invisible below 3 Microns. These sources were first detected with the Very Large Array and are therefore named VLA 1 and 2. The source HH 1-2 VLA 1 drives the HH 1/2 pair and the source VLA 2 drives the Herbig-Haro objects HH 144/145. There might be even a third outflow in the central region of HH 1/2, indicating a third member.

The jet towards HH 1 is visible in optical images, but the counterjet towards HH 2 was detected in the infrared with the Spitzer Space Telescope.

== Gallery ==
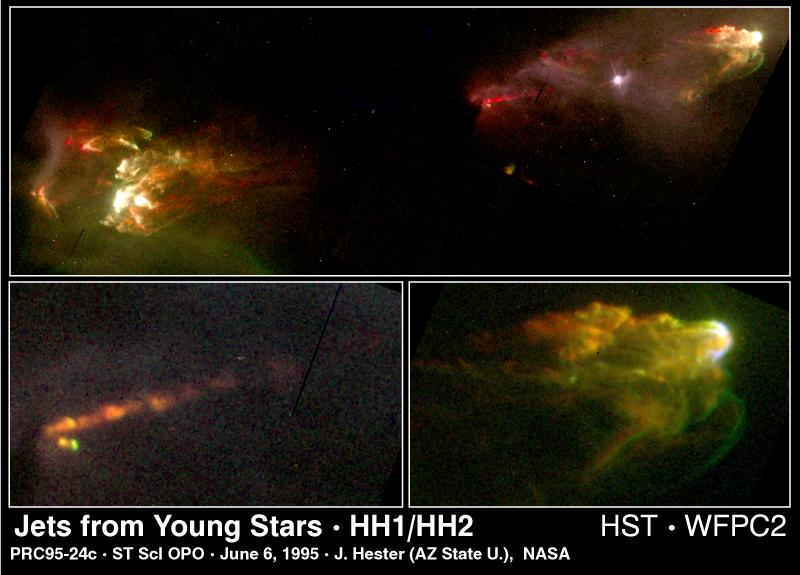
An older version of the region mapped by the WFPC2 of the Hubble Space Telescope. The image also shows the jet in the lower right part in more detail

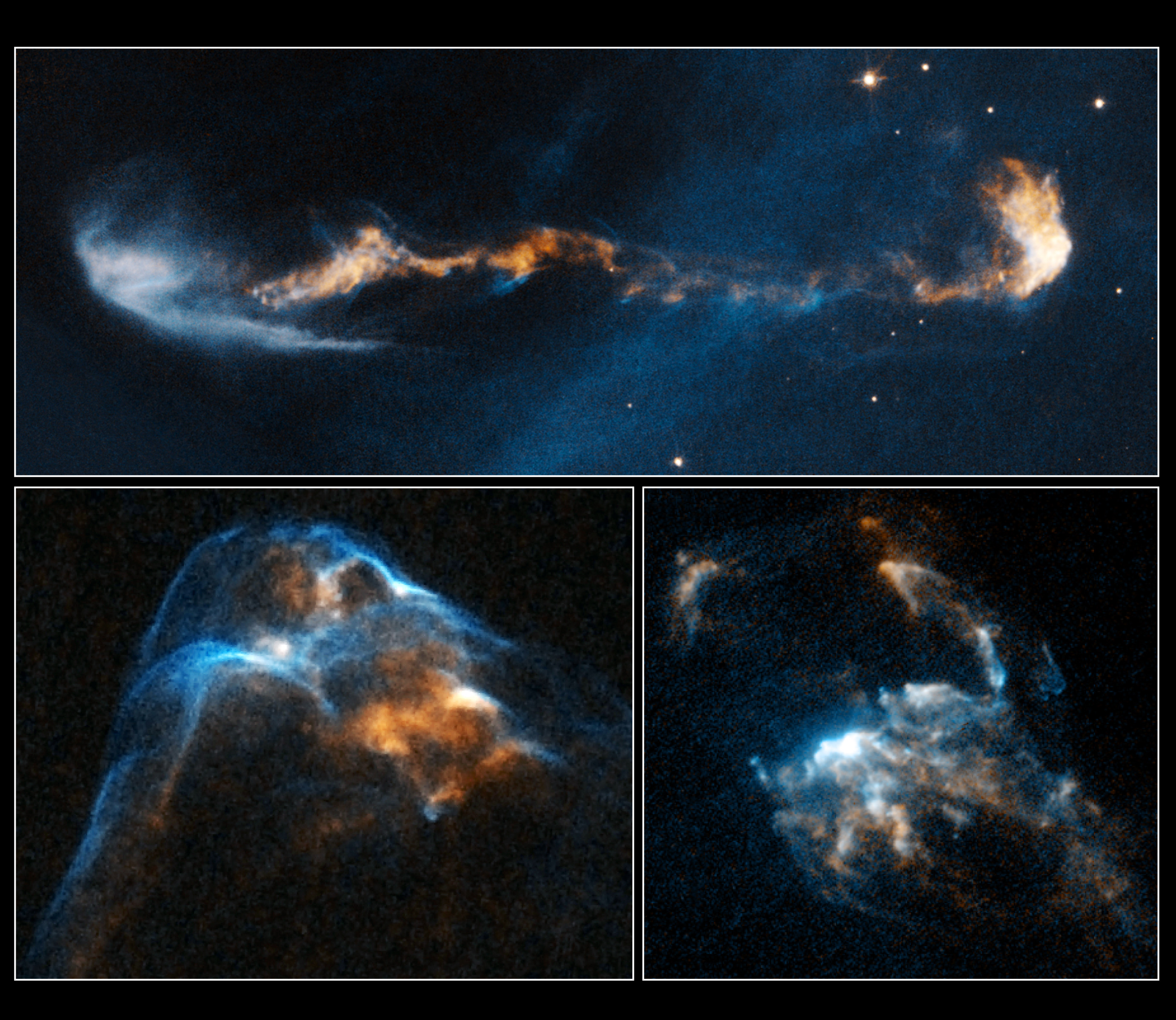
Multiple Herbig-Haro Objects mapped by the Hubble Space Telescope, including HH 2 at the lower right. HH 47 is at the top part and part of HH 34 is at the lower left.

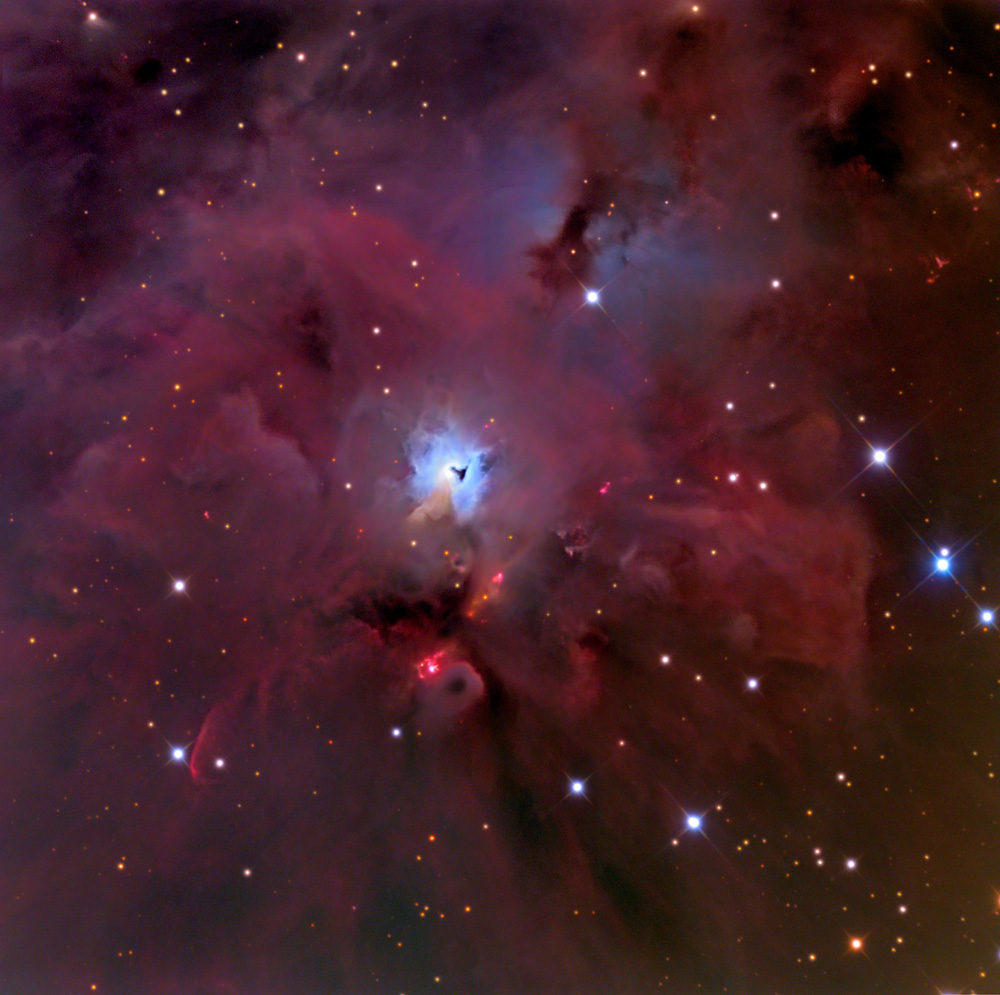
The reflection nebula NGC 1999 (blue cloud in the center) and the Herbig-Haro Objects HH 1/2 below NGC 1999 as small pink clouds.
