= HH 46 =

HH 46 can refer to:

- Boeing Vertol CH-46 Sea Knight, an American transport helicopter
- HH 46/47, a complex of Herbig-Haro objects located in the constellation of Vela
