= NGC 4162 =

Galaxy in the constellation Coma Berenices

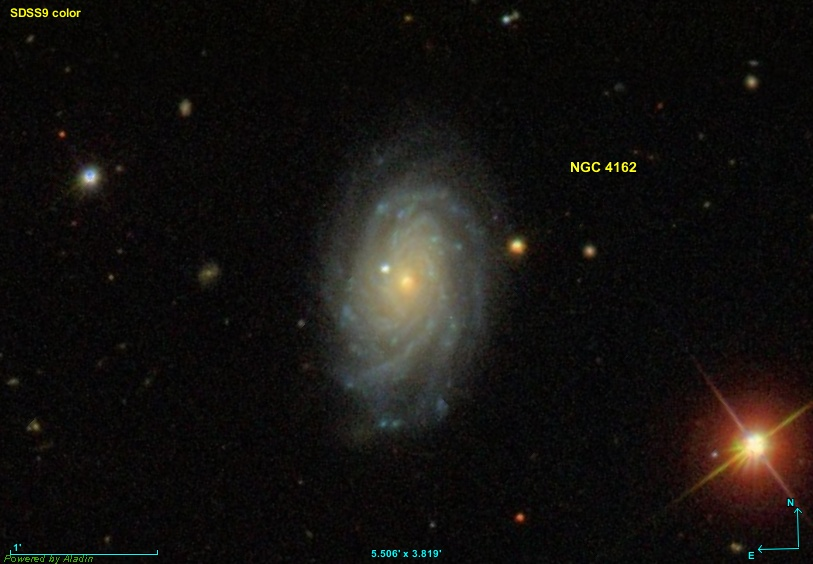
- NGC 4162 imaged by SDSS

Observation data (J2000 epoch)
- Constellation: Coma Berenices
- Right ascension: 12^{h} 11^{m} 52.5190^{s}
- Declination: +24° 07′ 25.346″
- Redshift: 0.008579±0.000005
- Heliocentric radial velocity: 2,572±1 km/s
- Distance: 118.00 ± 5.96 Mly (36.179 ± 1.828 Mpc)
- Apparent magnitude (V): 12.87

Characteristics
- Type: (R)SA(rs)bc
- Size: ~85,800 ly (26.31 kpc) (estimated)
- Apparent size (V): 2.3′ × 1.4′

Other designations
- IRAS 12093+2423, UGC 7193, MCG +04-29-046, PGC 038851, CGCG 128-051

NGC 4162 is a spiral galaxy in the constellation of Coma Berenices. Its velocity with respect to the cosmic microwave background is 2,878±21 km/s, which corresponds to a Hubble distance of 138.5 ± 9.8 Mly (42.45 ± 2.99 Mpc). However, 19 non-redshift measurements give a closer mean distance of 118.00 ± 5.96 Mly (36.179 ± 1.828 Mpc). It was discovered by German-British astronomer William Herschel on 10 April 1785.

NGC 4162 has an active galactic nucleus, i.e. it has a compact region at the center of a galaxy that emits a significant amount of energy across the electromagnetic spectrum, with characteristics indicating that this luminosity is not produced by the stars.

== Supernovae ==
Three supernovae have been observed in NGC 4162:

- SN 1965G (type unknown, mag. 14) was discovered by Mexican astronomer Guillermo Haro on 23 March 1965.
- SN 2001hg (Type II, mag. 17.4) was discovered by Tim Puckett and Ajai Sehgal on 4 December 2001.
- SN 2019edo (Type II, mag. 16.7) was discovered by ASAS-SN on 27 April 2019.

== See also ==
- List of NGC objects (4001–5000)
