= Mayrit 1701117 =

Proto-brown dwarf

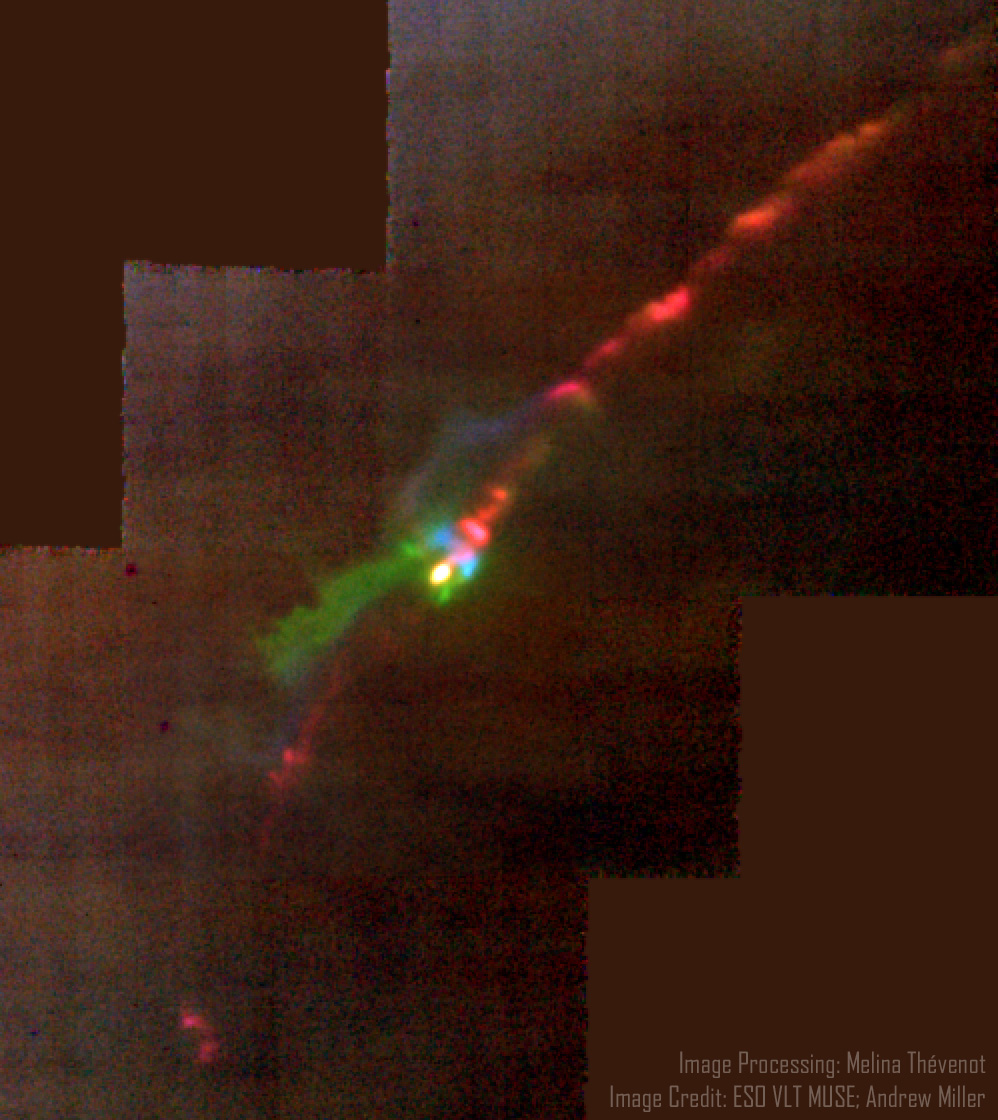
- Large outflow around Mayrit 1701117 with ESO VLT MUSE, showing sulfur in red, nitrogen in blue and H-alpha in green

Observation data Epoch J2000 Equinox J2000
- Constellation: Orion
- Right ascension: 05^{h} 40^{m} 25.8041^{s}
- Declination: −02° 48′ 55.501″

Characteristics
- Evolutionary stage: proto-brown dwarf
- Apparent magnitude (G): 17.842±0.031
- Apparent magnitude (I): 16.538±0.07
- Apparent magnitude (J): 15.146±0.039
- Apparent magnitude (H): 14.101±0.030
- Apparent magnitude (K): 13.074±0.036

Astrometry
Proper motion (μ)	RA: 0.429±0.315 mas/yr Dec.: 1.834±0.298 mas/yr
Parallax (π)	3.3546±0.3747 mas
Distance	approx. 1,000 ly (approx. 300 pc)

Details
Mass	~40 M_{Jup}
Luminosity	0.012 L_{☉}
Age	30,000-40,000 years

Other designations
- ESO-HA 1736, 2MASS J05402580-0248553, Gaia DR2 3216418342740867840, TIC 11359910

Database references
SIMBAD	data

Mayrit 1701117 (M1701117) is a proto-brown dwarf launching a large (0.8 light-years, 0.26 parsec) Herbig-Haro object, called HH 1165. Previously only small micro-jets (≤0.03 parsec) were known from young proto-brown dwarfs.

Mayrit 1701117 was discovered in 2008 in the Mayrit catalogue by J. A. Caballero. The Mayrit catalogue is a list of stars and high-mass brown dwarfs in the Sigma Orionis cluster. The catalogue uses DENIS and 2MASS data. Later, the source was detected in H-alpha with the ESO Schmidt telescope at La Silla and catalogued as ESO-HA 1736. The central object has a mass of around 0.04–0.08 M_{☉} and will most likely evolve into a brown dwarf. The central object is surrounded by a H-alpha halo with a clumpy distribution, which could be due to wind-envelope interactions. The southeastern tail of the H-alpha emission is likely reflecting the light from the nearby star HR 1950. The mass of the central source was later estimated to be around 40 M_{J} and the system is 30,000-40,000 years old.

== The disk and outflow ==
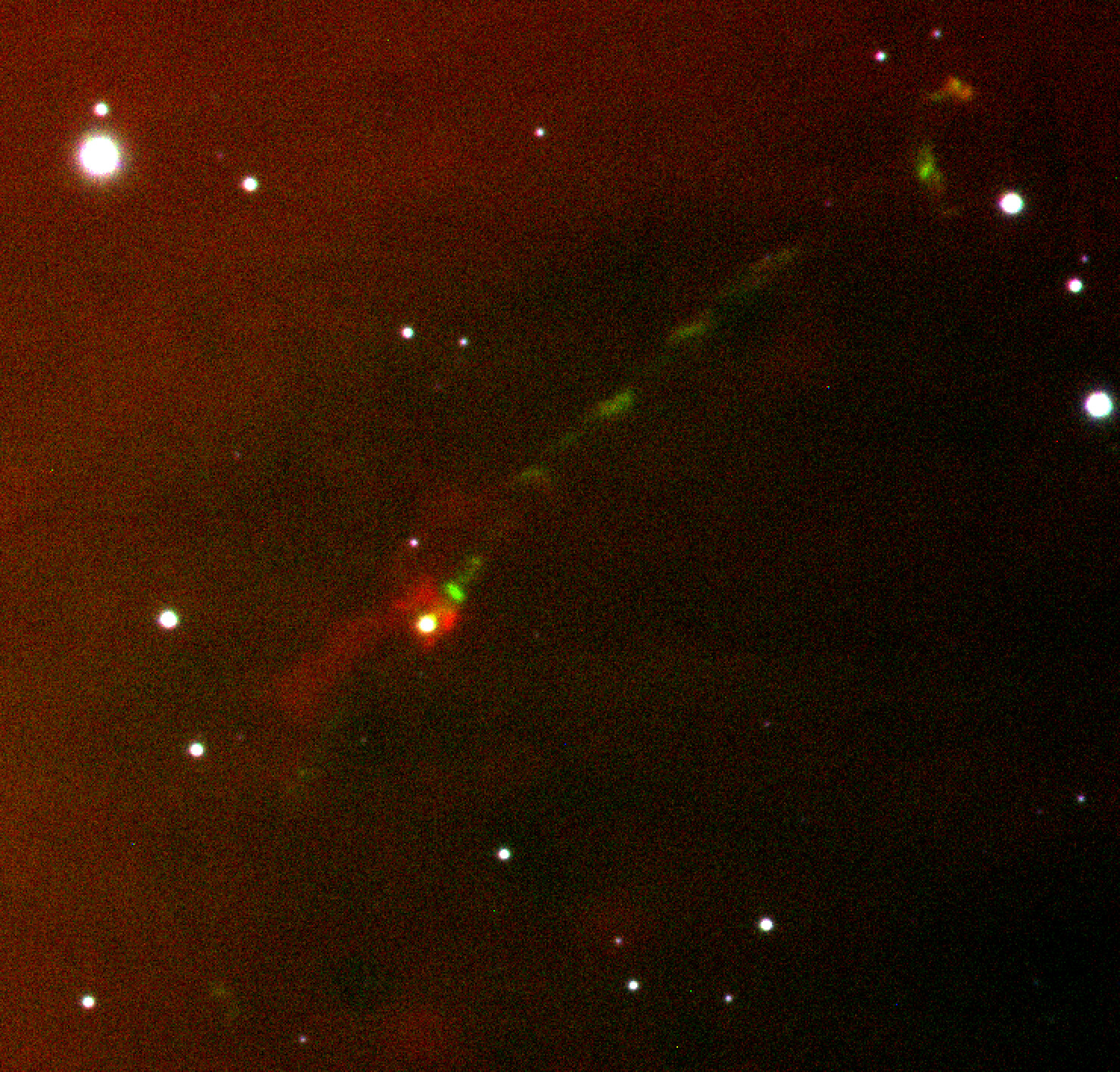
Discovery image of the jet with SOAR

Observations at the Calar Alto 3.5-m telescope were used to measure an accretion rate of 6.4×10^{−10} M_{☉}/year and an outflow rate of 10^{−9} M_{☉}/year, similar to class I protostars. The researchers also obtained observations with the James Clerk Maxwell Telescope and find that the total envelope+disk mass is around 36 M_{J}. VLT/UVES observations do show signs of strong accretion and outflow and the estimated outflow rate is higher than the previous estimate at (35±17)×10^{−10} M_{☉}/year. Observations with ALMA detected a pseudo-disk. According to core-collapse models, infalling material will form a flattened disk-like structure, which is called pseudo-disk. This pseudo-disk is rotating and surrounds the Keplerian disk. The pseudo-disk in Mayrit 1701117 has a size of 165–192 AU and a mass of around 0.02 M_{☉}. Emission by H_{2}CO likely traces the Keplerian disk and N_{2}D^{+} traces a clump close to this disk. Using ALMA the researchers determined the total mass of the circumstellar material as 20.98±1.24 M_{J}.

In 2017 a large Herbig-Haro object was discovered with SOAR narrow-band imaging. The Herbig-Haro object was named HH 1165 and the jet shows a bent C-shape, multiple knots and fragmented bow shocks at the end of the jets. The jet is mostly detected in sulfur [S II] emission, showing 8 knots in the northwestern direction. A fainter counter-jet in the southeastern direction shows only two knots. The multiple knots can be seen as individual ejection events. The H-alpha image shows a bright scattered emission next to the jet, likely tracing the outflow cavity. The northwest part resembles a classical jet running into a neutral medium, but the southern part resembles an externally irradiated jet.
