= V380 Orionis =

Star in the constellation Orion

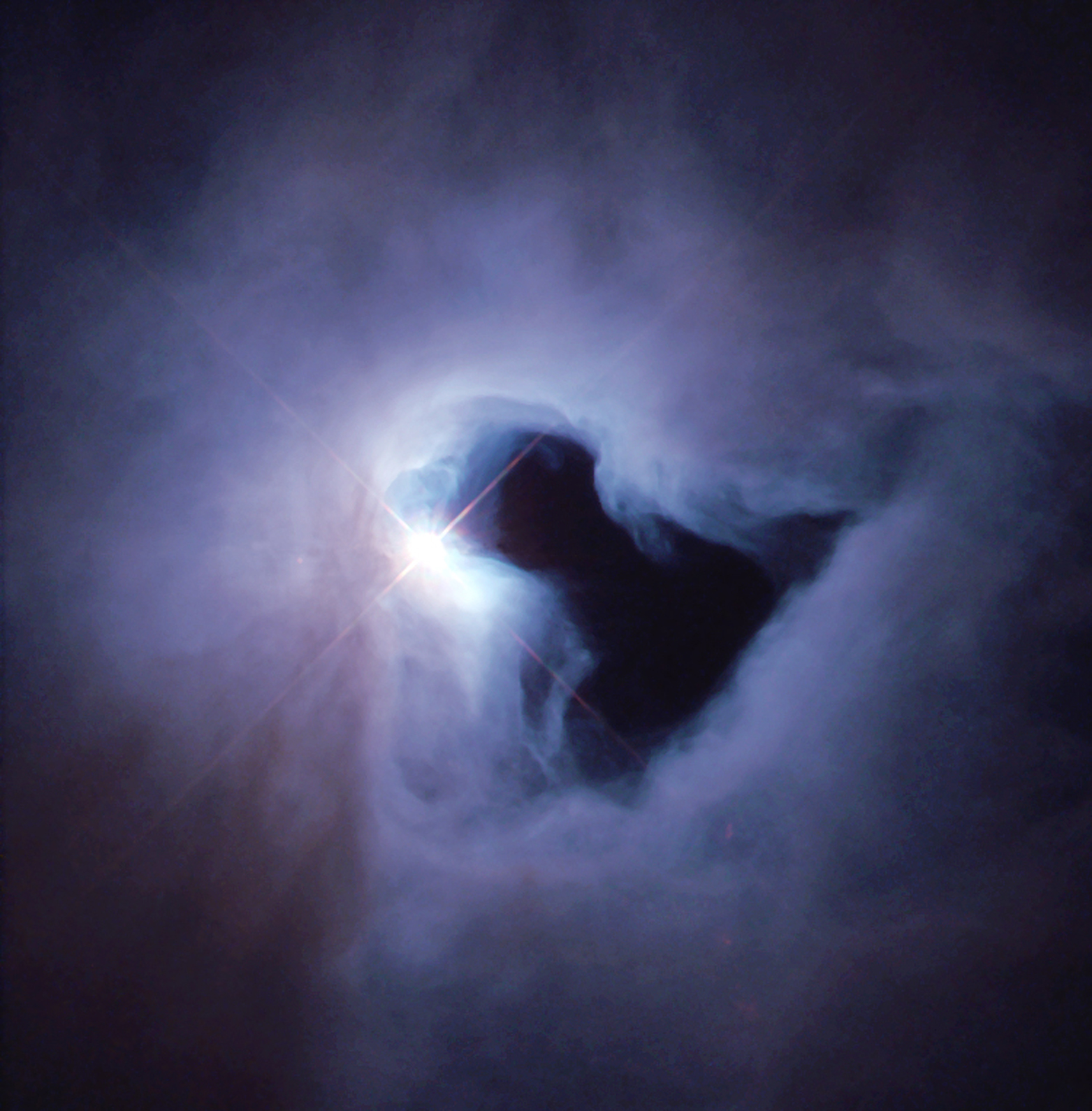
- V380 Ori embedded in NGC 1999; Credit: NASA and the Hubble Heritage Team (STScI)

Observation data Epoch J2000 Equinox ICRS
- Constellation: Orion
- Right ascension: 05^{h} 36^{m} 25.43205^{s}
- Declination: −06° 42′ 57.6847″
- Apparent magnitude (V): 10.2–10.7

Characteristics
- Spectral type: A1e
- Variable type: Orion variable

Astrometry
Radial velocity (R_{v})	+15.40 km/s
Proper motion (μ)	RA: −0.667 mas/yr Dec.: −2.408 mas/yr
Parallax (π)	2.6425±0.1117 mas
Distance	1,230 ± 50 ly (380 ± 20 pc)

Orbit
Period (P)	104±5 days
Semi-amplitude (K_{1}) (primary)	< 1.4 km/s
Semi-amplitude (K_{2}) (secondary)	18±14 km/s

Details

Primary
Mass	2.87 M_{☉}
Radius	3 R_{☉}
Luminosity	100 L_{☉}
Temperature	10,500±500 K
Metallicity [Fe/H]	0.5 dex
Rotation	4.31276 days
Rotational velocity (v sin i)	6.7±1.1 km/s

Secondary
Mass	1.6 M_{☉}
Radius	2 R_{☉}
Luminosity	3.16 L_{☉}
Temperature	5,500±500 K
Rotational velocity (v sin i)	18.7±3.2 km/s
Age	2±1 Myr

Other designations
- V380 Ori, BD−06°1253, HIP 26327, WDS J05365-0643

Database references
SIMBAD	data

V380 Ori is a young multiple star system located near the Orion Nebula in the constellation Orion, thought to be somewhere between 1 and 3 million years old. It lies at the centre of NGC 1999 and is the primary source lighting up this and other nebulae in the region.

== System ==
V380 Orionis is a multiple star system containing at least three stars. A very faint cool star 9" away is also thought to be gravitationally bound, making it a hierarchical quadruple system. Two infrared sources within NGC 1999 have been listed as companions in some catalogues, but are not thought to be stars. When discovered, they were referred to as V380 Ori-B and V-380 Ori-C, a notation which can lead to confusion.

The main component is visible as the 10th magnitude variable star at the centre of NGC 1999, referred to as the primary. Speckle interferometry shows a cool companion separated by 0.15", approximately 62 AU, referred to as the tertiary. Spectroscopy shows a third star at a projected separation less than 0.33 AU, referred to as the secondary. The two closest stars, the primary and tertiary, are surrounded by a circumstellar disk, lying almost edge-on to observers on earth. The fourth star has a projected separation of 4,000 AU and is receding from the other three.

The system is believed to have formed with all four stars close together, but interacted to eject the smallest star into an unstable but gravitationally bound orbit around 20,000 years ago.

The primary and secondary, the two closest stars, are calculated to orbit every 104 days. The radial velocity signatures in the spectrum have a large margin of uncertainty and the orbit is poorly defined. Comparing the mass ratio found from the orbit with masses assumed from other physical properties suggests that the orbit is seen close to pole-on.

== Properties ==
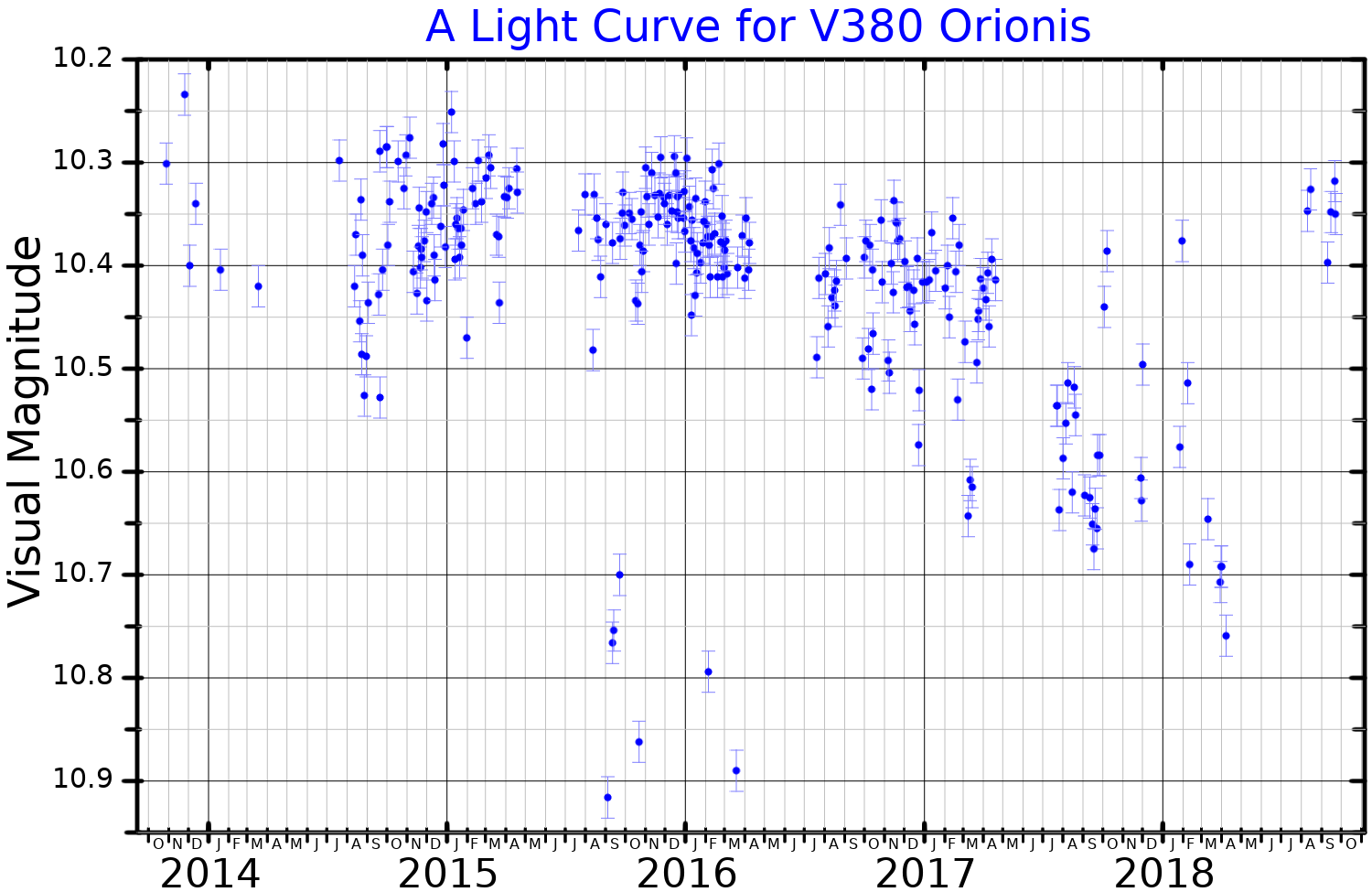
A light curve for V380 Orionis, plotted from ASAS-SN data

The primary star is a hot white Herbig Ae/Be star that has been variously assigned spectral types between B9 and A1. It has a surface temperature of 10,500 ± 500 K, is around 2.87 times as massive as the sun, 3 times its radius, and 100 times as luminous. It has a strong magnetic field which varies every 4.1 days and this is assumed to be the star's rotation period. Models show that the axis of rotation is inclined at 32 degrees. It is a variable star, considered an Orion variable, with occasional fading and other variability caused by obscuration from the surrounding dust. The apparent magnitude varies irregularly between 10.2 and 10.7. The properties of the star are calculated based on its maximum brightness, assumed to be the least obscured.

The secondary is a T Tauri star, detected by distinctive spectral lines that could not be produced by the hotter primary star, that has a surface temperature of 5,500 ± 500 K, is around 1.6 times as massive as the sun, twice its radius, and three times as luminous.

The nature of the tertiary component is uncertain. No spectral lines have been seen originating from this component.

The fourth star, sometimes called V380 Orionis B, is a small, cool object of spectral type M5 or M6 that is either a red dwarf or brown dwarf.

== Nebulosity ==
One of the component stars of V380 Orionis appears to have launched a astrophysical jet that helped to clear the keyhole-shaped hole in the surrounding nebula known as NGC 1999. The system is surrounded by a bow shock—the total structure over 17 light-years (5.3 parsecs) across.
