= George Herbig =

American astronomer (1920–2013)

- Born: January 2, 1920; Wheeling, West Virginia
- Died: October 12, 2013 (aged 93); Honolulu, Oahu, Hawaii
- Citizenship: United States
- Education: UCLA; University of California, Berkeley (PhD)
- Known for: Herbig–Haro objects Herbig Ae/Be stars
- Awards: Helen B. Warner Prize (1955); Henry Norris Russell Lectureship (1975); Bruce Medal (1980)
- Scientific career
- Fields: Star formation, interstellar medium
- Workplaces: University of Hawaiʻi

George Howard Herbig (January 2, 1920 – October 12, 2013) was an American astronomer at the University of Hawaiʻi Institute for Astronomy. He is perhaps best known for his contribution to the discovery of Herbig–Haro objects.

== Background ==
Born in 1920 in Wheeling, West Virginia, Herbig received his Doctor of Philosophy in 1948 at the University of California, Berkeley; his dissertation is titled A Study of Variable Stars in Nebulosity.

== Career ==
His specialty was stars at an early stage of evolution (a class of intermediate mass pre–main sequence stars are named Herbig Ae/Be stars after him) and the interstellar medium. He was perhaps best known for his discovery, with Guillermo Haro, of the Herbig–Haro objects; bright patches of nebulosity excited by bipolar outflow from a star being born.

Herbig also made prominent contributions to the field of diffuse interstellar band (DIB) research, especially through a series of nine articles published between 1963 and 1995 entitled "The diffuse interstellar bands."

== Honors ==
Awards

- Helen B. Warner Prize for Astronomy of the American Astronomical Society (1955)
- Foreign Scientific Member, Max-Planck-Institut für Astronomie, Heidelberg
- Henry Norris Russell Lectureship of the AAS (1975)
- Médaille, Université de Liège (1969)
- Bruce Medal of the Astronomical Society of the Pacific (1980)
- Petrie Prize and Lectureship of the Canadian Astronomical Society (1995)

Named after him

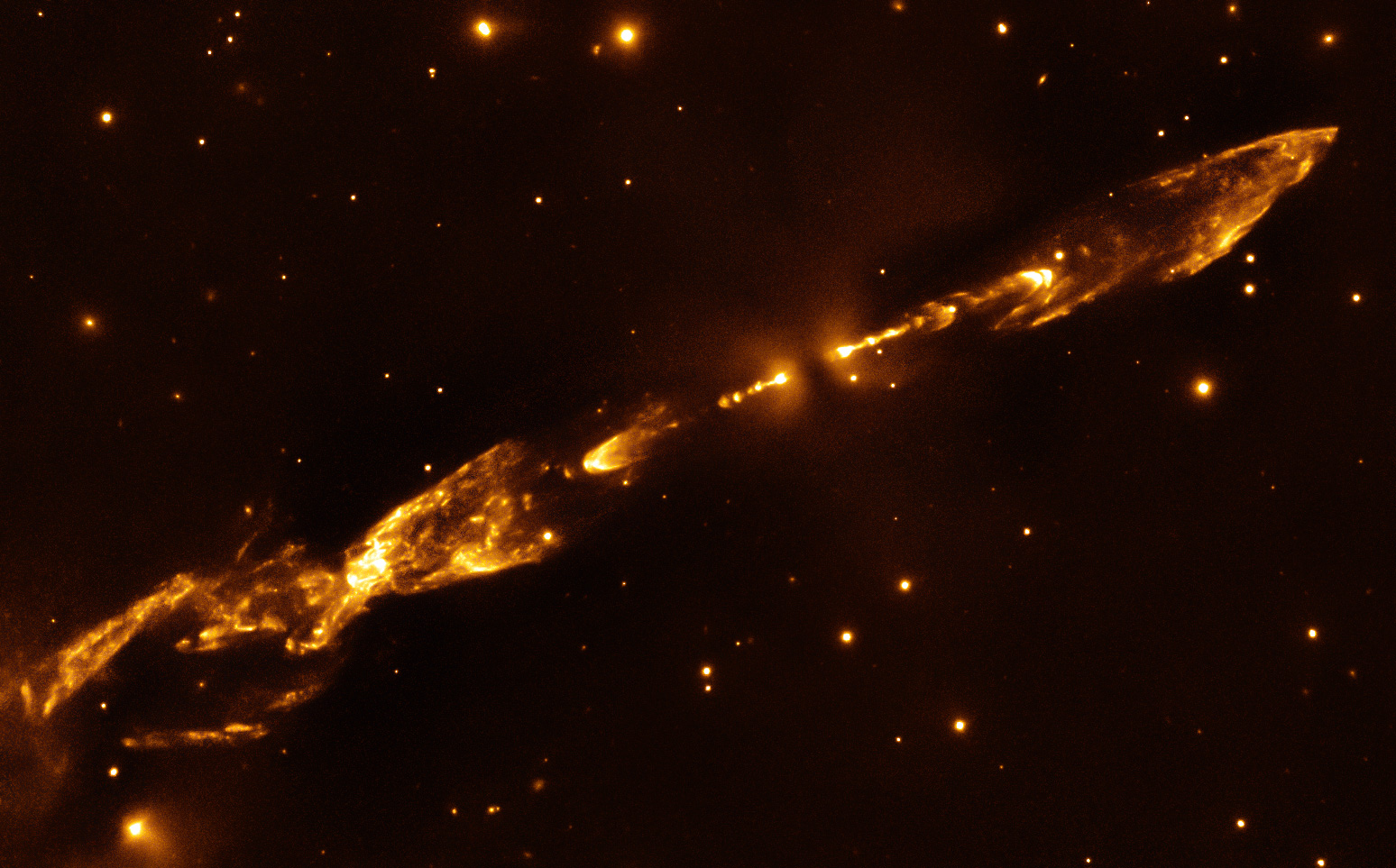
Herbig–Haro object (HH) 212.

- Asteroid 11754 Herbig
- Herbig Ae/Be stars
- Herbig–Haro objects

== Selected publications ==
- "High-Resolution Spectroscopy of FU Orionis Stars", ApJ 595 (2003) 384–411
- "The Young Cluster IC 5146", AJ 123 (2002) 304–327
- "Barnard's Merope Nebula Revisited: New Observational Results", AJ 121 (2001) 3138–3148
- "The Diffuse Interstellar Bands", Annu. Rev. Astrophys. 33 (1995) 19–73
- "The Unusual Pre-Main-Sequence star VY Tauri", ApJ 360 (1990) 639–649
- "The Structure and Spectrum of R Monocerotis", ApJ 152 (1968) 439
- "The Spectra of Two Nebulous Objects Near NGC 1999", ApJ 113 (1951) 697
