= NGC 1999 =

Reflection nebula in the constellation Orion

Reflection nebula
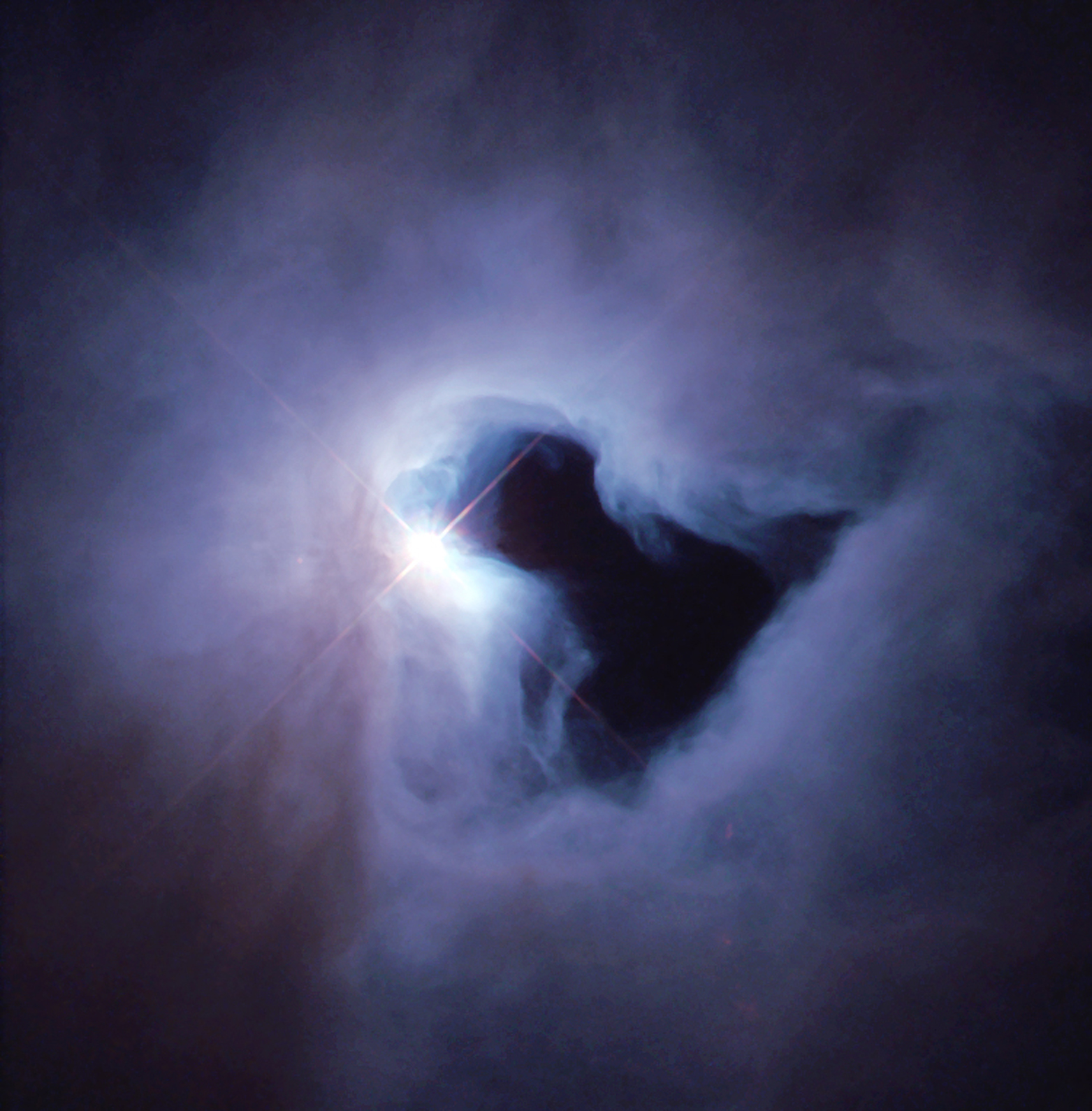
- Hubble/WFPC2 captures the void in 2000

Observation data: J2000 epoch
- Right ascension: 05^{h} 36^{m} 27.00^{s}
- Declination: −06° 43′ 18.0″
- Distance: 1,500 ly
- Apparent dimensions (V): 1.5′
- Constellation: Orion

Physical characteristics
- Radius: ~0.3 ly

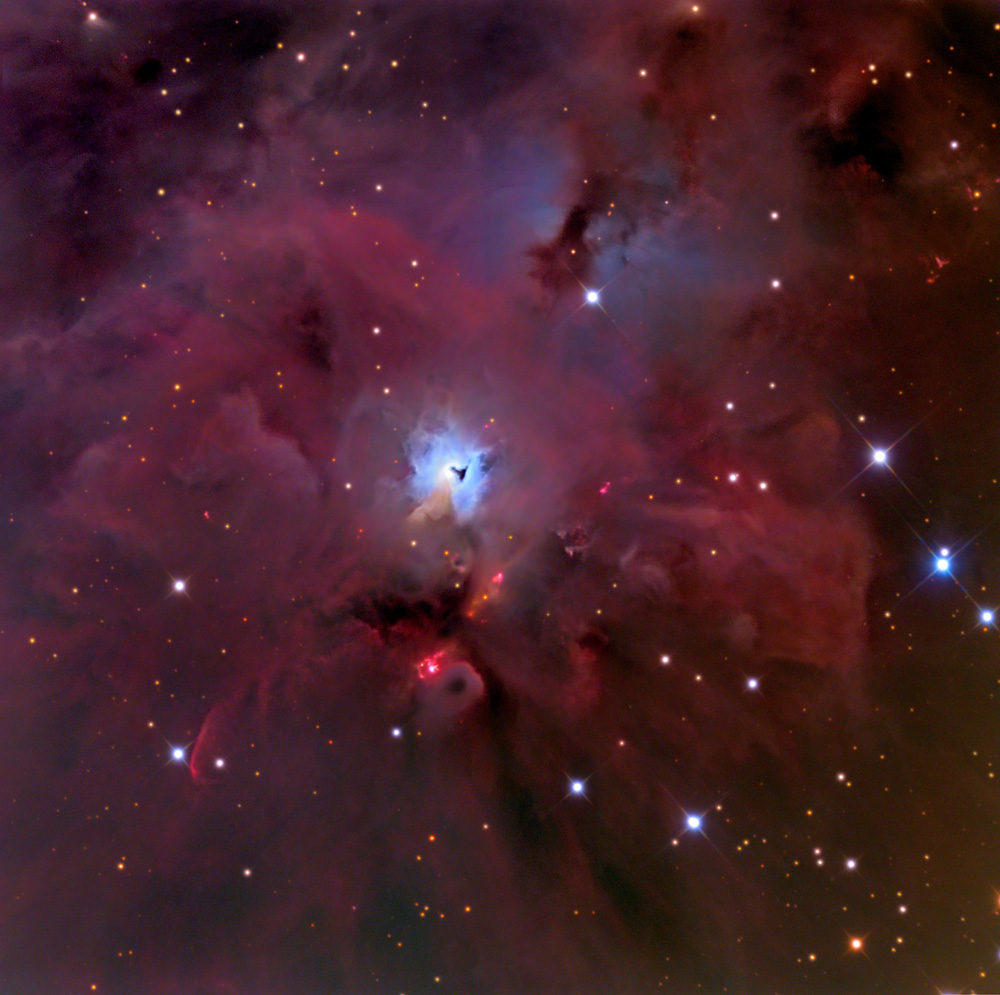
The overall nebula with smaller hole shown in context

NGC 1999, also known as the 13th Pearl Nebula or Rubber Stamp Nebula, is a dust-filled bright nebula with a vast hole of empty space represented by a black patch of sky, as can be seen in the photograph. Alternatively, it known as The Cosmic Keyhole. It is a reflection nebula, and shines from the light of the variable star V380 Orionis.

It was previously believed that the black patch was a dense cloud of dust and gas which blocked light that would normally pass through, called a dark nebula. Analysis of this patch by the infrared telescope Herschel (October 9, 2009), which has the capability of penetrating such dense cloud material, resulted in continued black space. This led to the belief that either the cloud material was immensely dense or that an unexplained phenomenon had been detected.

With support from ground-based observations done using the submillimeter bolometer cameras on the Atacama Pathfinder Experiment radio telescope (November 29, 2009) and the Mayall (Kitt Peak) and Magellan telescopes (December 4, 2009), it was determined that the patch looks black not because it is an extremely dense pocket of gas, but because it is truly empty. The exact cause of this phenomenon is still being investigated, although it has been hypothesized that narrow jets of gas from some of the young stars in the region punctured the sheet of dust and gas, as well as, powerful radiation from a nearby mature star may have helped to create the hole. Researchers believe this discovery should lead to a better understanding of the entire star forming process.

It is located 1,500 light-years away from Earth in the constellation Orion. HH 1/2, the first recognized Herbig-Haro Object, is located near NGC 1999.
