= HH 46/47 =

Herbig-Haro objects in the constellation Vela

Emission nebula
- Herbig–Haro object
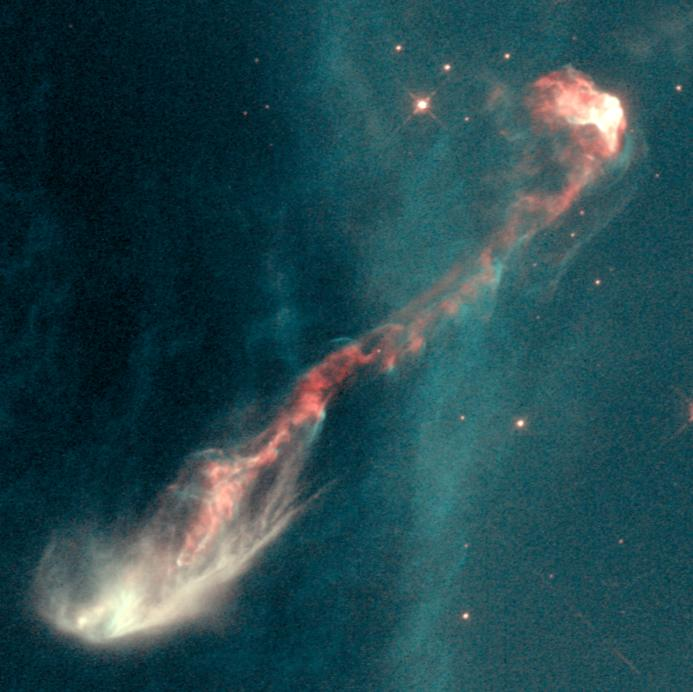
- HH object 46/47. HH 46 is the nebula on lower left, while HH 47 is in the upper right. HH 47B connects the two.

Observation data: J2000 epoch
- Right ascension: 08^{h} 25^{m} 43.6^{s}
- Declination: −51° 00′ 36″
- Distance: 1470 ly (450 pc)
- Constellation: Vela
- Designations: HH 46/47, HH 46, HH 47.

HH 46/47 is a complex of Herbig–Haro objects (HH objects), located around 450 parsecs (about 1,470 light-years) away in a Bok globule near the Gum Nebula. Jets of partially ionized gas emerging from a young star produce visible shocks upon impact with the ambient medium. Discovered in 1977, it is one of the most studied HH objects and the first jet to be associated with young stars was found in HH 46/47. Four emission nebulae, HH 46, HH 47A, HH 47C and HH 47D and a jet, HH 47B, have been identified in the complex. It also contains a mostly unipolar molecular outflow, and two large bow shocks on opposite sides of the source star. The overall size of the complex is about 3 parsecs (10 light years).

== History of observations ==
This object was discovered in 1977 by American astronomer, R. D. Schwartz. In accordance with the naming convention for HH objects, he named two nebulae he found HH 46 and HH 47, as they were the 46th and 47th HH objects to be discovered. The jet and other nebulae were soon identified in the complex. This was the first jet to be discovered near a protostar. Prior to this, it was unclear how Herbig–Haro objects are formed. One model at that time suggested that they reflect light from embedded stars and hence are reflection nebulae. Based on spectral similarities between supernova remnants and HH objects, Schwartz theorized in 1975 that HH objects are produced by radiative shocks. In this model stellar winds from T Tauri stars would collide with the surrounding medium and generate shocks leading to emission. With the discovery of the jet in HH 46/47, it became clear that HH objects were not reflection nebulae, but shock driven emission nebulae which were powered by jets ejected from protostars. Due to its impact on the field of HH objects, brightness and collimated jet, it is one of the most studied HH objects. An image of a question mark associated with the object was reported on 18 August 2023 in The New York Times.

Hubble Space Telescope video shows material is moving away from the source. Changes in brightness over the period of 14 years can be noted.

== Formation ==
During early stages of formation, stars launch bipolar outflows of partially ionized material along the rotation axis. It is generally believed that the interaction of accretion disk magnetic fields with stellar magnetic fields propels some of the accreting material in the form of outflows. In some cases, outflow is collimated into jets. The source of HH 46/47 is a binary class I protostar located inside a dark cloud of gas and dust, undetectable at visual wavelengths. It is ejecting material at about 150 km/s (Note: This is with respect to star. Space velocity is 300 km/s.) into a bipolar jet which emerges from the cloud. (Note: Receding jet is a bit slower at 125 km/s with respect to star.) Upon impacting the surrounding medium, the jet drives shocks in it, which lead to emission in the visible spectrum. Variations in eruptions result in different velocities of ejected material. This leads to shocks within the jet, as fast moving material from later ejections collides with slow moving material from earlier ejections. These shocks produce emissions, rendering the jet visible.

== Properties ==
Star (center), approaching lobe (top right) and receding lobe (lower left) are clearly visible in this infrared image by James Webb Space Telescope. Absence of molecular outflow in approaching lobe is evident. This structure is 0.57 parsec across.

Although the outflow is bipolar, only one jet is visible at visual wavelengths. The counterjet is invisible as it is moving away from Earth into the dark cloud that hosts the star inside it. At infrared wavelengths, however, it is clearly visible. It terminates in HH 47C, a bright bow shock, as it interacts with the surrounding gas. HH 46 is located near the source and is an emission/reflection nebula; it emits light due to impacting jet material and also reflects light from the source. Its brightness changes radically in the course of years, which is directly related to the variability of the parent star. From HH 46 emerges HH 47B, a long and twisted jet which is blueshifted. (Note: Jet originates from the star-disk system, but becomes visible only at the outer end of HH 46.) The bent and twisted appearance of the outflow is caused by variations in the ejection direction, i.e., precession of the source star. The jet ends in HH 47, also called HH 47A, the brightest nebula in the complex. A little further away is the somewhat fainter and more diffuse HH 47D. The complex stretches across 0.57 parsecs from HH 47C to HH 47D on the sky plane. Two relatively large bow shocks appear at even larger distances, with HH 47SW lying on the far side of the receding lobe and HH 47NE lying on the near side of the approaching blueshifted lobe. Each of them is about 1.3 parsecs from the source star, making whole complex appear 2.6 parsecs long in the sky plane. The whole structure is projected at approximately 30° with respect to the sky plane; this makes its actual length around 3 parsecs.

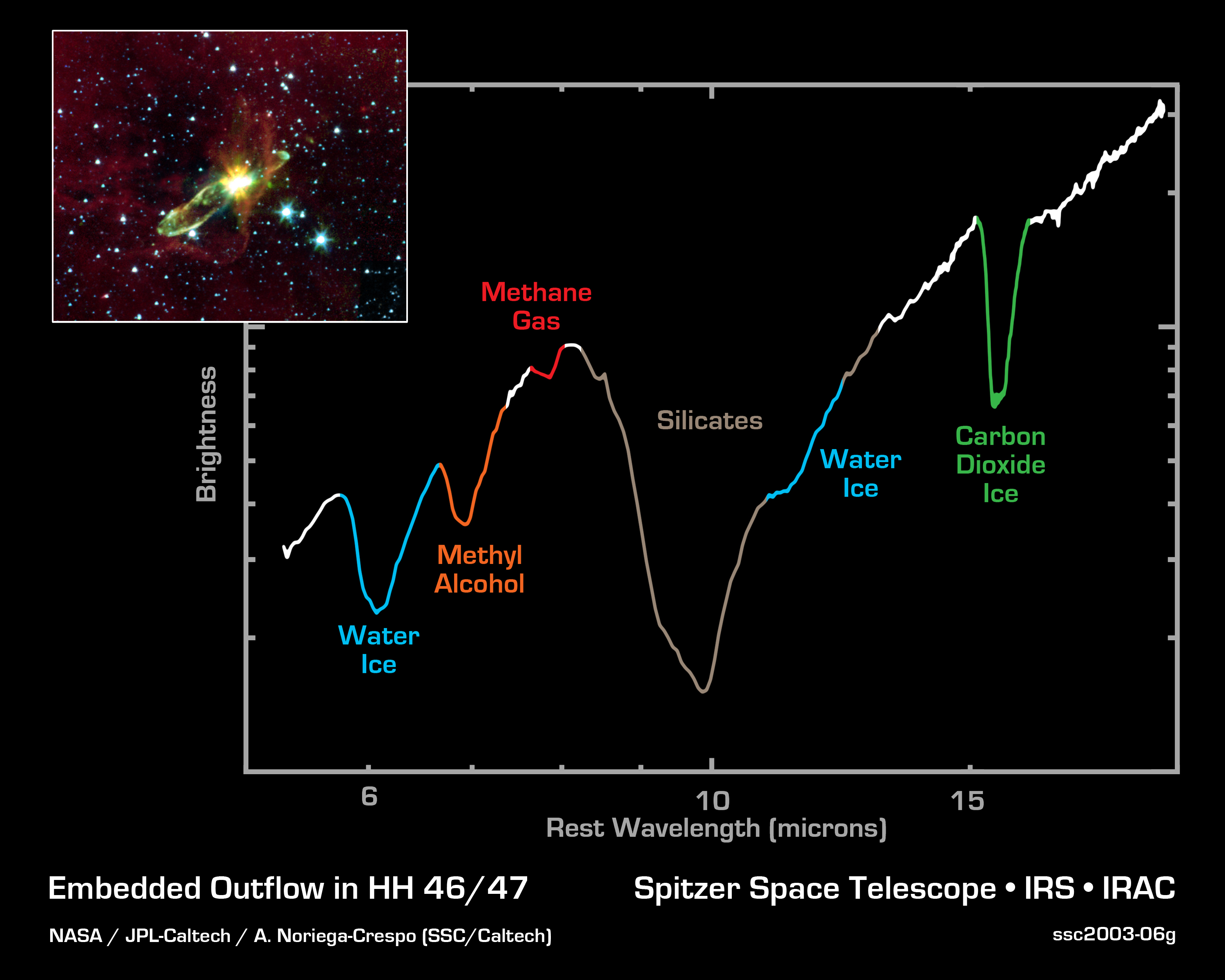
Infrared spectrum of the gaseous envelope of HH 46/47, obtained by NASA Spitzer Space Telescope. The medium in immediate vicinity of the star is silicate-rich.

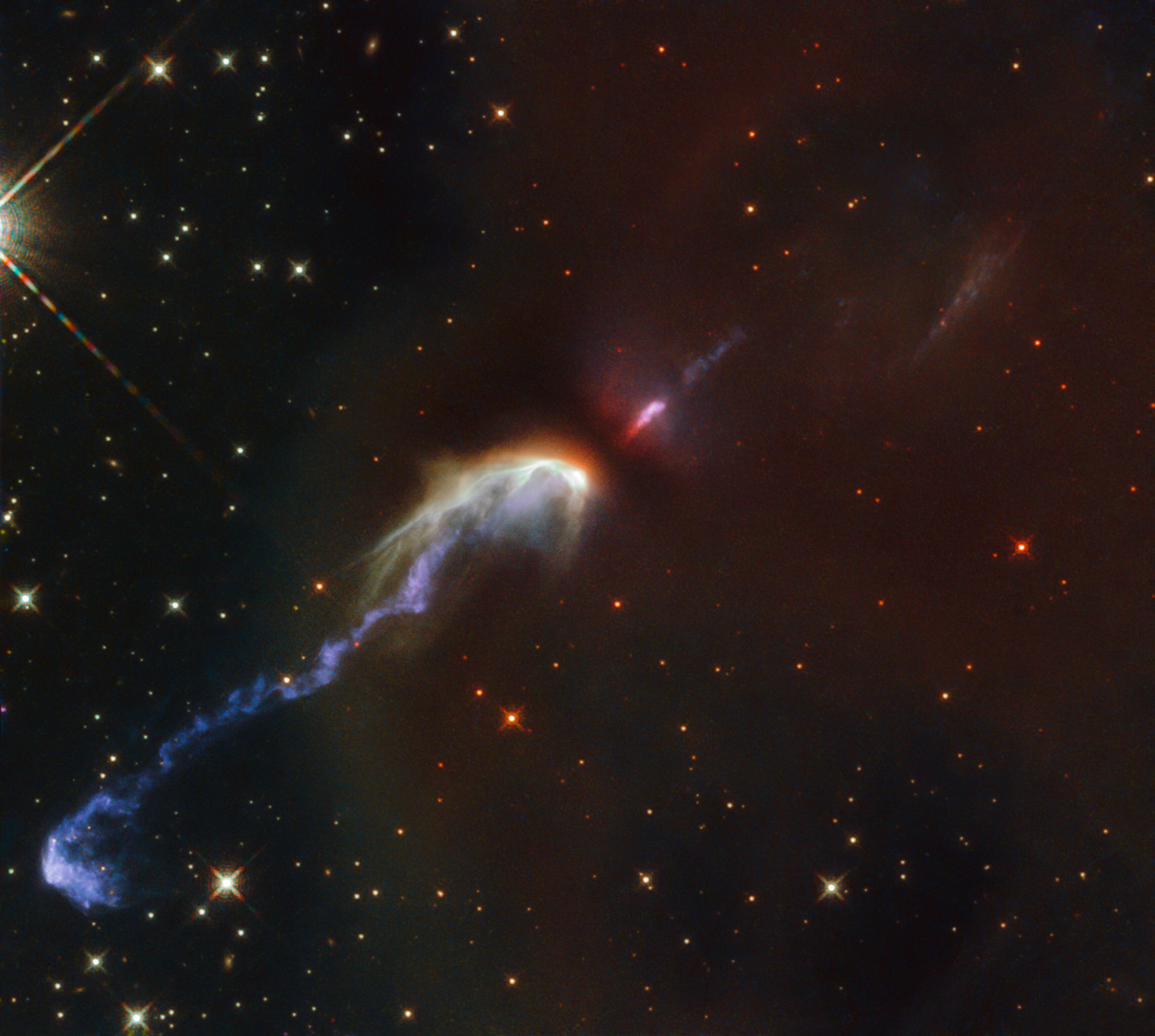
Herbig-Haro objects are some of the rarer sights in the night sky, taking the form of thin spindly jets of matter floating amongst the surrounding gas and stars.

The combined luminosity of the source star and disk is about 24 L_{☉}. It is accreting mass at the rate of 6×10^{−6} M_{☉} per year. Mass loss rate in the approaching jet has been determined to be about 4×10^{−7} M_{☉} per year, which is approximately 7% of the total mass accreted in a year. Around 3.6% of total material in the jet is ionized and average jet density is roughly 1400 cm^{−3}. Shock velocity in the jet is about 34 km/s.

Eruptions from the star are episodic. The current episode has been ongoing for about a thousand years, while the previous episode started about 6,000 years ago and lasted for 3,000 to 4,000 years. Large eruptions in the current episode occur every 400 years. Based on the extent of the complex, the age of the source star has been estimated to be 10^{4} to 10^{5} years.

=== Molecular outflow ===
The jet emanating from the star is transferring momentum into the molecular gas surrounding it, which lifts up the gas. This results in a 0.3 parsec long molecular outflow around the jet. This outflow, however, is largely unipolar and aligned with the receding jet. Approaching molecular outflow is extremely weak, which is probably because the jet breaks out of the cloud and there is little material outside to be lifted up in the form of molecular outflow. Speeds in molecular flows are much less than in jets. Several organic and inorganic compounds have been detected in the molecular outflow including methane, methanol, water ice, carbon monoxide, carbon dioxide (dry ice) and various silicates. The presence of ices implies that the dusty shroud of the star is cool as opposed to the jet and shock regions where temperatures reach thousands of degrees.

== See also ==
- Hayashi track
- HH 34
- Pre-main-sequence star
- Protoplanetary disk
