= Herbig–Haro object =

Small patches of nebulosity associated with newly born stars

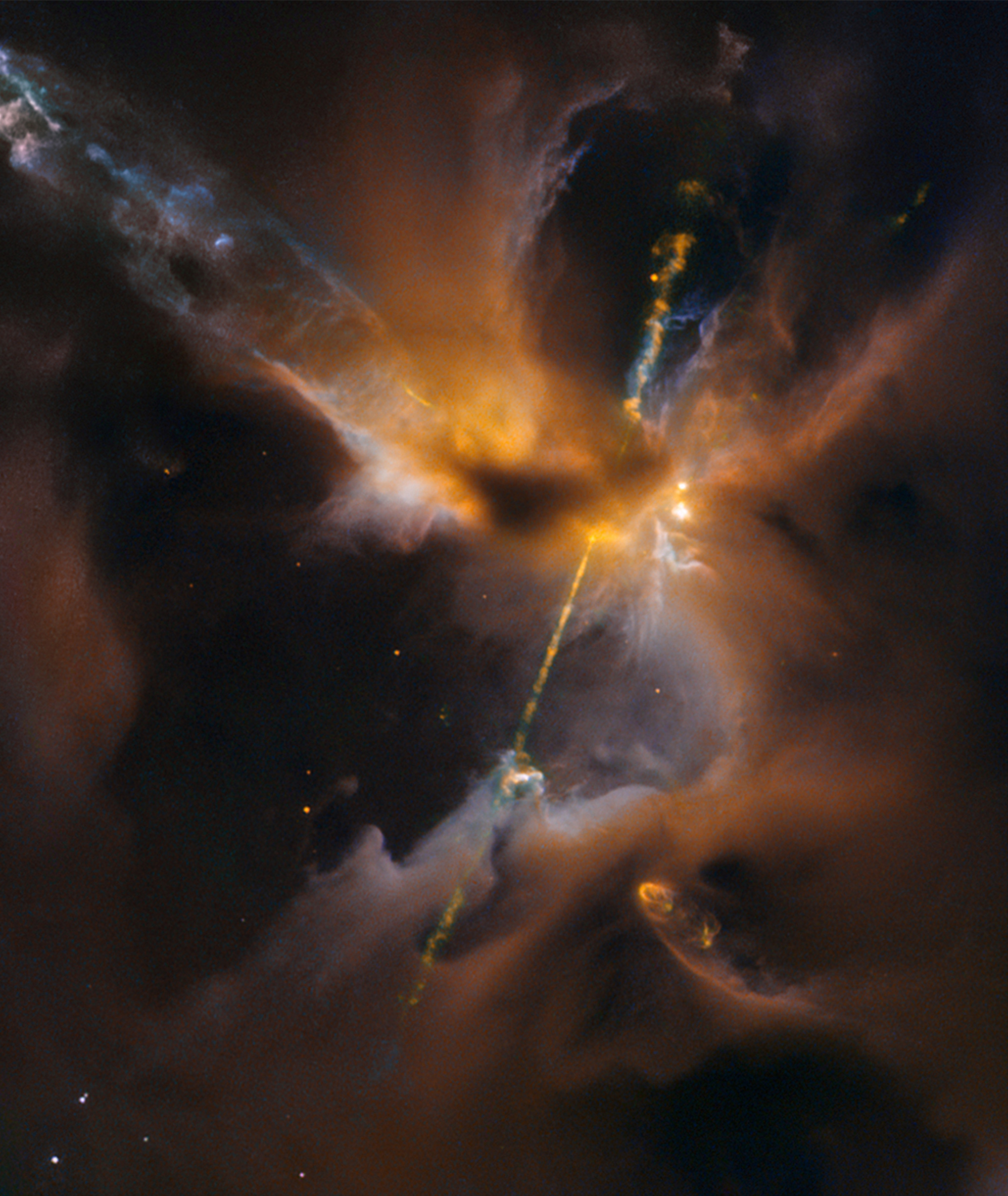
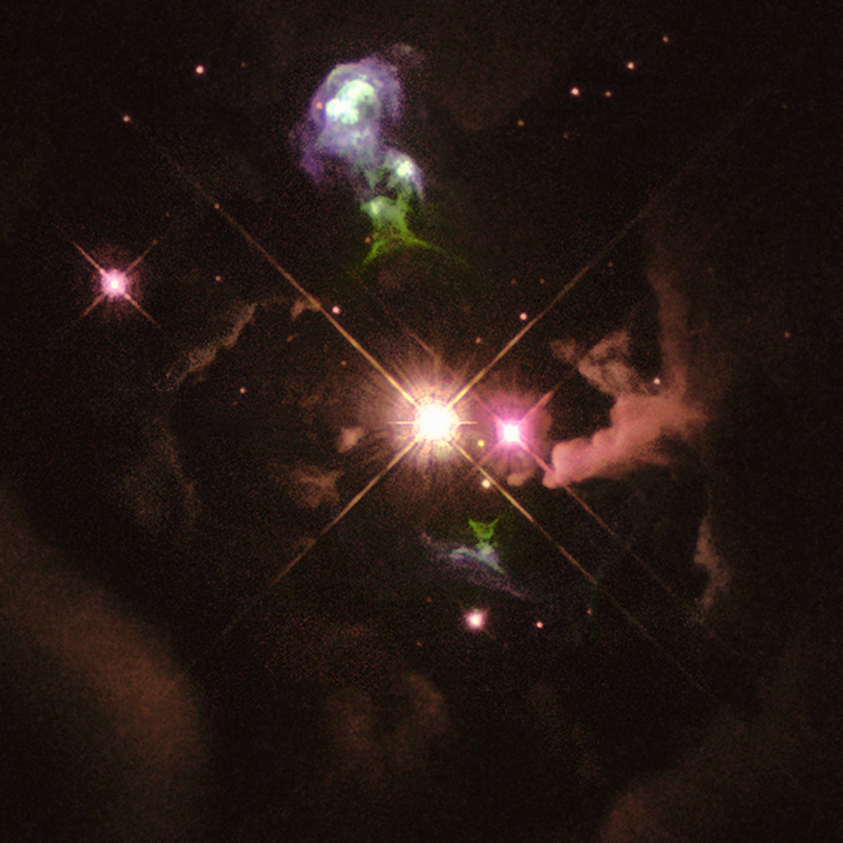
Hubble Space Telescope images of HH 24 (left) and HH 32 (right; top) – colourful nebulae are typical of Herbig–Haro objects

Herbig–Haro (HH) objects are bright patches of nebulosity associated with newborn stars. They are formed when narrow jets of partially ionised gas ejected by stars collide with nearby clouds of gas and dust at several hundred kilometers per second. Herbig–Haro objects are commonly found in star-forming regions, and several are often seen around a single star, aligned with its rotational axis. Most of them lie within about one parsec (3.26 light-years) of the source, although some have been observed several parsecs away. HH objects are transient phenomena that last around a few tens of thousands of years. They can change visibly over timescales of a few years as they move rapidly away from their parent star into the gas clouds of interstellar space (the interstellar medium or ISM). Hubble Space Telescope observations have revealed the complex evolution of HH objects over the period of a few years, as parts of the nebula fade while others brighten as they collide with the clumpy material of the interstellar medium.

First observed in the late 19th century by Sherburne Wesley Burnham, Herbig–Haro objects were recognised as a distinct type of emission nebula in the 1940s. The first astronomers to study them in detail were George Herbig and Guillermo Haro, after whom they have been named. Herbig and Haro were working independently on studies of star formation when they first analysed the objects, and recognised that they were a by-product of the star formation process. Although HH objects are visible-wavelength phenomena, many remain invisible at these wavelengths due to dust and gas, and can only be detected at infrared wavelengths. Such objects, when observed in near-infrared, are called molecular hydrogen emission-line objects (MHOs).

== Discovery and history of observations ==
The first HH object was observed in the late 19th century by Sherburne Wesley Burnham, when he observed the star T Tauri with the 36-inch (910 mm) refracting telescope at Lick Observatory and noted a small patch of nebulosity nearby. It was thought to be an emission nebula, later becoming known as Burnham's Nebula, and was not recognized as a distinct class of object. T Tauri was found to be a very young and variable star, and is the prototype of the class of similar objects known as T Tauri stars which have yet to reach a state of hydrostatic equilibrium between gravitational collapse and energy generation through nuclear fusion at their centres. Fifty years after Burnham's discovery, several similar nebulae were discovered with almost star-like appearance. Both George Herbig and Guillermo Haro made independent observations of several of these objects in the Orion Nebula during the 1940s. Herbig also looked at Burnham's Nebula and found it displayed an unusual electromagnetic spectrum, with prominent emission lines of hydrogen, sulfur and oxygen. Haro found that all the objects of this type were invisible in infrared light.

Following their independent discoveries, Herbig and Haro met at an astronomy conference in Tucson, Arizona in December 1949. Herbig had initially paid little attention to the objects he had discovered, being primarily concerned with the nearby stars, but on hearing Haro's findings he carried out more detailed studies of them. The Soviet astronomer Viktor Ambartsumian gave the objects their name (Herbig–Haro objects, normally shortened to HH objects), and based on their occurrence near young stars (a few hundred thousand years old), suggested they might represent an early stage in the formation of T Tauri stars. Studies of the HH objects showed they were highly ionised, and early theorists speculated that they were reflection nebulae containing low-luminosity hot stars deep inside. But the absence of infrared radiation from the nebulae meant there could not be stars within them, as these would have emitted abundant infrared light. In 1975 American astronomer R. D. Schwartz theorized that winds from T Tauri stars produce shocks in the ambient medium on encounter, resulting in generation of visible light. With the discovery of the first proto-stellar jet in HH 46/47, it became clear that HH objects are indeed shock-induced phenomena with shocks being driven by a collimated jet from protostars.

== Formation ==
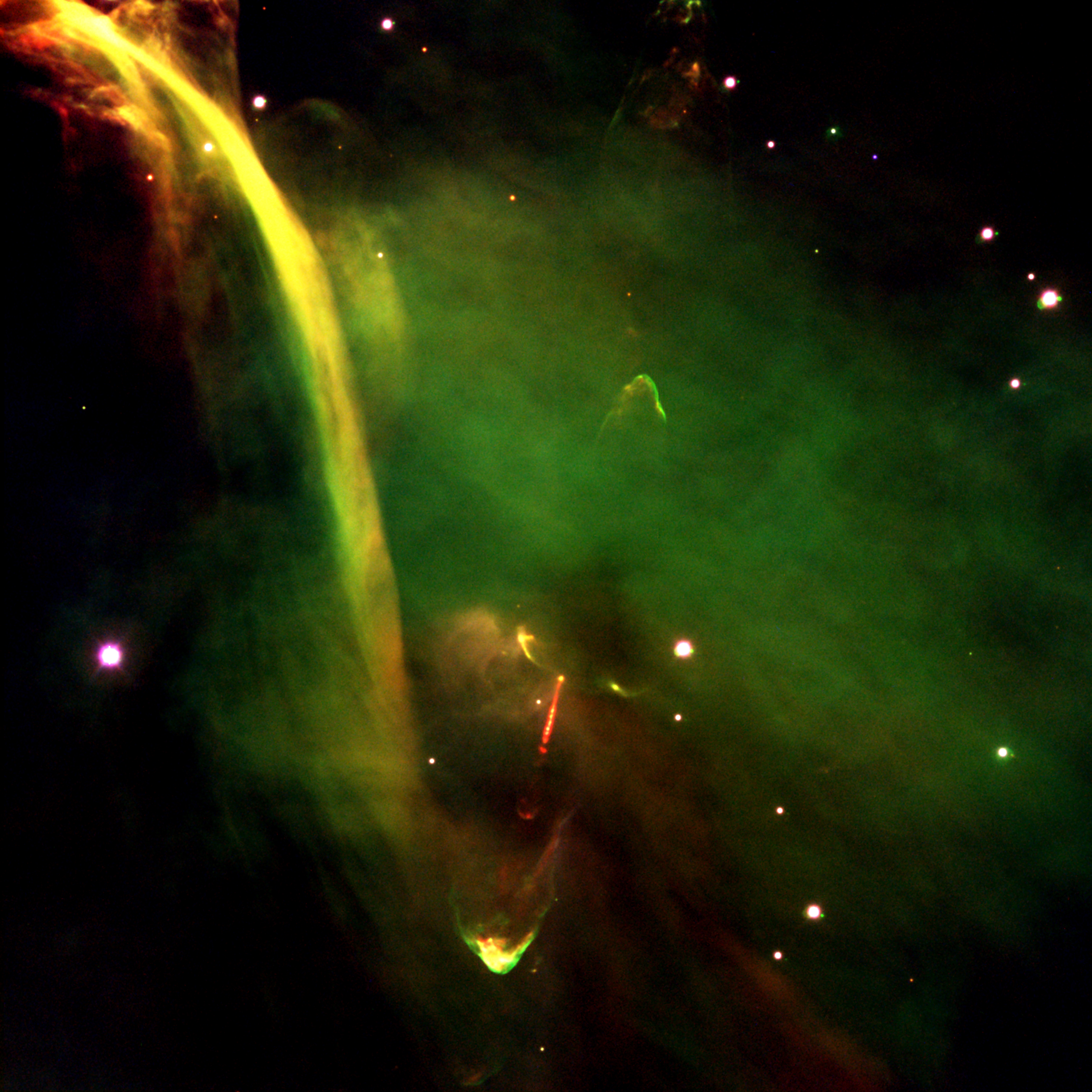
HH objects are formed when accreted material is ejected by a protostar as ionized gas along the star's axis of rotation, as exemplified by HH 34 (right).

Stars form by gravitational collapse of interstellar gas clouds. As the collapse increases the density, radiative energy loss decreases due to increased opacity. This raises the temperature of the cloud which prevents further collapse, and a hydrostatic equilibrium is established. Gas continues to fall towards the core in a rotating disk. The core of this system is called a protostar. Some of the accreting material is ejected out along the star's axis of rotation in two jets of partially ionised gas (plasma). The mechanism for producing these collimated bipolar jets is not entirely understood, but it is believed that interaction between the accretion disk and the stellar magnetic field accelerates some of the accreting material from within a few astronomical units of the star away from the disk plane. At these distances the outflow is divergent, fanning out at an angle in the range of 10−30°, but it becomes increasingly collimated at distances of tens to hundreds of astronomical units from the source, as its expansion is constrained. The jets also carry away the excess angular momentum resulting from accretion of material onto the star, which would otherwise cause the star to rotate too rapidly and disintegrate. When these jets collide with the interstellar medium, they give rise to the small patches of bright emission which comprise HH objects.

== Properties ==
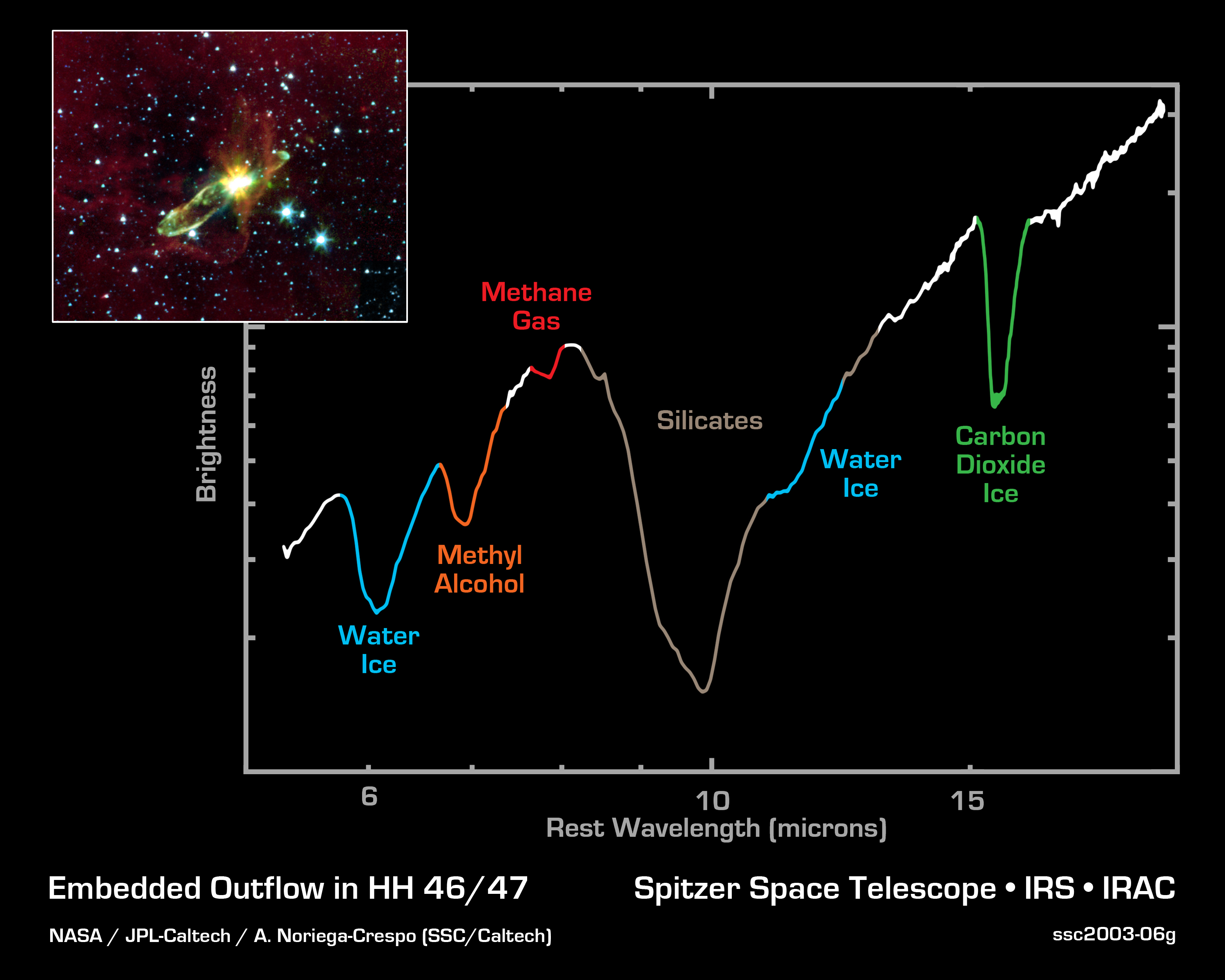
Infrared spectrum of HH 46/47 obtained by the Spitzer Space Telescope, showing the medium in immediate vicinity of the star being silicate-rich

Electromagnetic emission from HH objects is caused when their associated shock waves collide with the interstellar medium, creating what is called the "terminal working surfaces". The spectrum is continuous, but also has intense emission lines of neutral and ionized species. Spectroscopic observations of HH objects' doppler shifts indicate velocities of several hundred kilometers per second, but the emission lines in those spectra are weaker than what would be expected from such high-speed collisions. This suggests that some of the material they are colliding with is also moving along the beam, although at a lower speed. Spectroscopic observations of HH objects show they are moving away from the source stars at speeds of several hundred kilometres per second. In recent years, the high optical resolution of the Hubble Space Telescope has revealed the proper motion (movement along the sky plane) of many HH objects in observations spaced several years apart. As they move away from the parent star, HH objects evolve significantly, varying in brightness on timescales of a few years. Individual compact knots or clumps within an object may brighten and fade or disappear entirely, while new knots have been seen to appear. These arise likely because of the precession of their jets, along with the pulsating and intermittent eruptions from their parent stars. Faster jets catch up with earlier slower jets, creating the so-called "internal working surfaces", where streams of gas collide and generate shock waves and consequent emissions.

The total mass being ejected by stars to form typical HH objects is estimated to be of the order of 10^{−8} to 10^{−6} M_{☉} per year, a very small amount of material compared to the mass of the stars themselves but amounting to about 1–10% of the total mass accreted by the source stars in a year. Mass loss tends to decrease with increasing age of the source. The temperatures observed in HH objects are typically about 9,000–12,000 K, similar to those found in other ionized nebulae such as H II regions and planetary nebulae. Densities, on the other hand, are higher than in other nebulae, ranging from a few thousand to a few tens of thousands of particles per cm^{3}, compared to a few thousand particles per cm^{3} in most H II regions and planetary nebulae.

Densities also decrease as the source evolves over time. HH objects consist mostly of hydrogen and helium, which account for about 75% and 24% of their mass respectively. Around 1% of the mass of HH objects is made up of heavier chemical elements, including oxygen, sulfur, nitrogen, iron, calcium and magnesium. Abundances of these elements, determined from emission lines of respective ions, are generally similar to their cosmic abundances. Many chemical compounds found in the surrounding interstellar medium, but not present in the source material, such as metal hydrides, are believed to have been produced by shock-induced chemical reactions. Around 20–30% of the gas in HH objects is ionized near the source star, but this proportion decreases at increasing distances. This implies the material is ionized in the polar jet, and recombines as it moves away from the star, rather than being ionized by later collisions. Shocking at the end of the jet can re-ionise some material, giving rise to bright "caps".

== Numbers and distribution ==
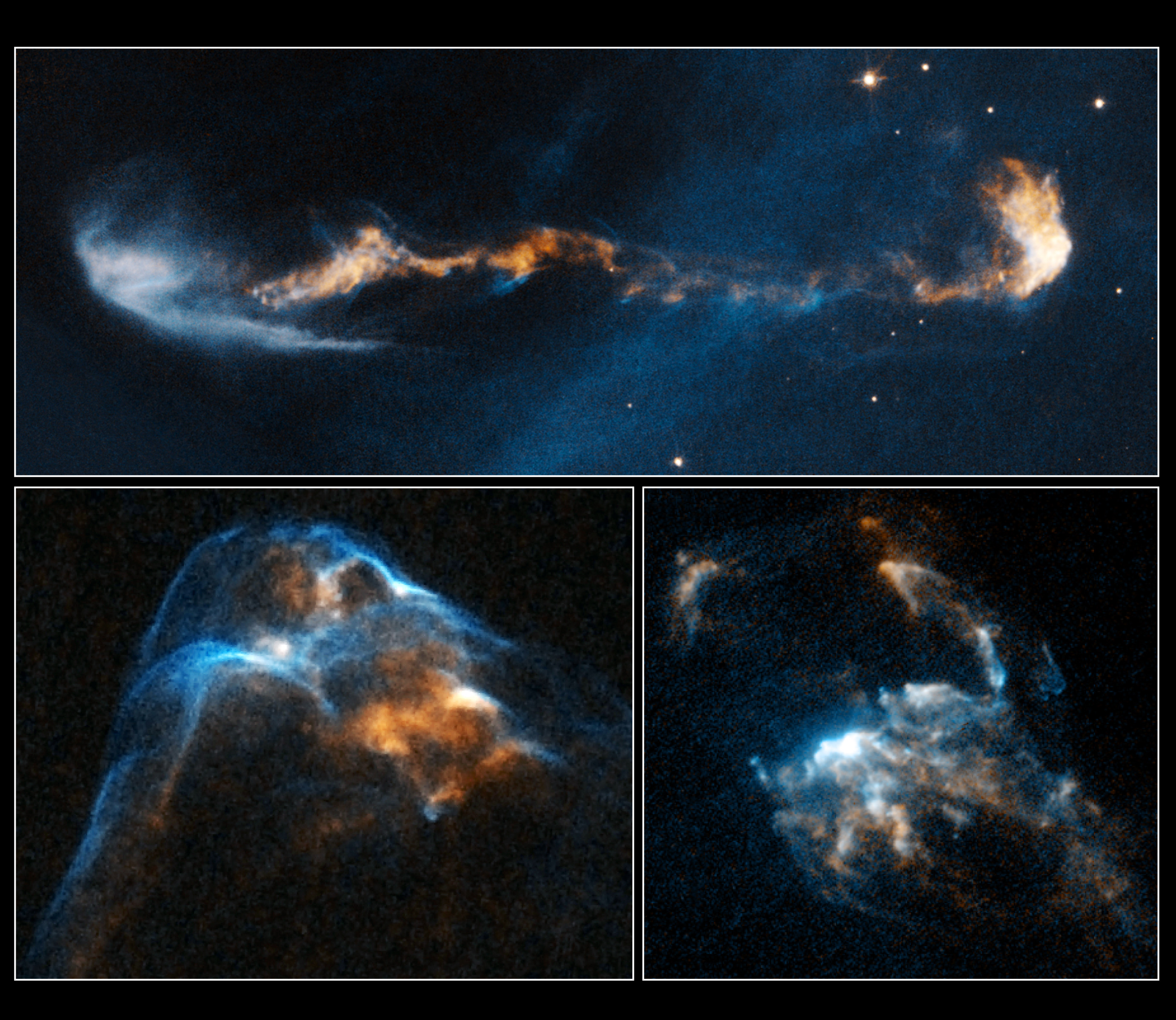
HH 2 (lower right), HH 34 (lower left), and HH 47 (top) were numbered in order of their discovery; it is estimated that there are up to 150,000 such objects in the Milky Way.

HH objects are named approximately in order of their identification; HH 1/2 being the earliest such objects to be identified. More than a thousand individual objects are now known. They are always present in star-forming H II regions, and are often found in large groups. They are typically observed near Bok globules (dark nebulae which contain very young stars) and often emanate from them. Several HH objects have been seen near a single energy source, forming a string of objects along the line of the polar axis of the parent star. The number of known HH objects has increased rapidly over the last few years, but that is a very small proportion of the estimated up to 150,000 in the Milky Way, the vast majority of which are too far away to be resolved. Most HH objects lie within about one parsec of their parent star. Many, however, are seen several parsecs away.

HH 46/47 is located about 450 parsecs (1,500 light-years) away from the Sun and is powered by a class I protostar binary. The bipolar jet is slamming into the surrounding medium at a velocity of 300 kilometers per second, producing two emission caps about 2.6 parsecs (8.5 light-years) apart. Jet outflow is accompanied by a 0.3 parsecs (0.98 light-years) long molecular gas outflow which is swept up by the jet itself. Infrared studies by Spitzer Space Telescope have revealed a variety of chemical compounds in the molecular outflow, including water (ice), methanol, methane, carbon dioxide (dry ice) and various silicates. Located around 460 parsecs (1,500 light-years) away in the Orion A molecular cloud, HH 34 is produced by a highly collimated bipolar jet powered by a class I protostar. Matter in the jet is moving at about 220 kilometers per second. Two bright bow shocks, separated by about 0.44 parsecs (1.4 light-years), are present on the opposite sides of the source, followed by series of fainter ones at larger distances, making the whole complex about 3 parsecs (9.8 light-years) long. The jet is surrounded by a 0.3 parsecs (0.98 light-years) long weak molecular outflow near the source.

== Source stars ==
Thirteen-year timelapse of material ejecting from a class I protostar, forming the Herbig–Haro object HH 34

The stars from which HH jets are emitted are all very young stars, a few tens of thousands to about a million years old. The youngest of these are still protostars in the process of collecting from their surrounding gases. Astronomers divide these stars into classes 0, I, II and III, according to how much infrared radiation the stars emit. A greater amount of infrared radiation implies a larger amount of cooler material surrounding the star, which indicates it is still coalescing. The numbering of the classes arises because class 0 objects (the youngest) were not discovered until classes I, II and III had already been defined.

Class 0 objects are only a few thousand years old; so young that they are not yet undergoing nuclear fusion reactions at their centres. Instead, they are powered only by the gravitational potential energy released as material falls onto them. They mostly contain molecular outflows with low velocities (less than a hundred kilometres per second) and weak emissions in the outflows. Nuclear fusion has begun in the cores of Class I objects, but gas and dust are still falling onto their surfaces from the surrounding nebula, and most of their luminosity is accounted for by gravitational energy. They are generally still shrouded in dense clouds of dust and gas, which obscure all their visible light and as a result can only be observed at infrared and radio wavelengths. Outflows from this class are dominated by ionized species and velocities can range up to 400 kilometres per second. The in-fall of gas and dust has largely finished in Class II objects (Classical T Tauri stars), but they are still surrounded by disks of dust and gas, and produce weak outflows of low luminosity. Class III objects (Weak-line T Tauri stars) have only trace remnants of their original accretion disk.

About 80% of the stars giving rise to HH objects are binary or multiple systems (two or more stars orbiting each other), which is a much higher proportion than that found for low mass stars on the main sequence. This may indicate that binary systems are more likely to generate the jets which give rise to HH objects, and evidence suggests the largest HH outflows might be formed when multiple–star systems disintegrate. It is thought that most stars originate from multiple star systems, but that a sizable fraction of these systems are disrupted before their stars reach the main sequence due to gravitational interactions with nearby stars and dense clouds of gas.

The first and currently only (as of May 2017) large-scale Herbig–Haro object around a proto-brown dwarf is HH 1165, which is connected to the proto-brown dwarf Mayrit 1701117. HH 1165 has a length of 0.8 light-years (0.26 parsec) and is located in the vicinity of the sigma Orionis cluster. Previously only small mini-jets (≤0.03 parsec) were found around proto-brown dwarfs.

== Infrared counterparts ==
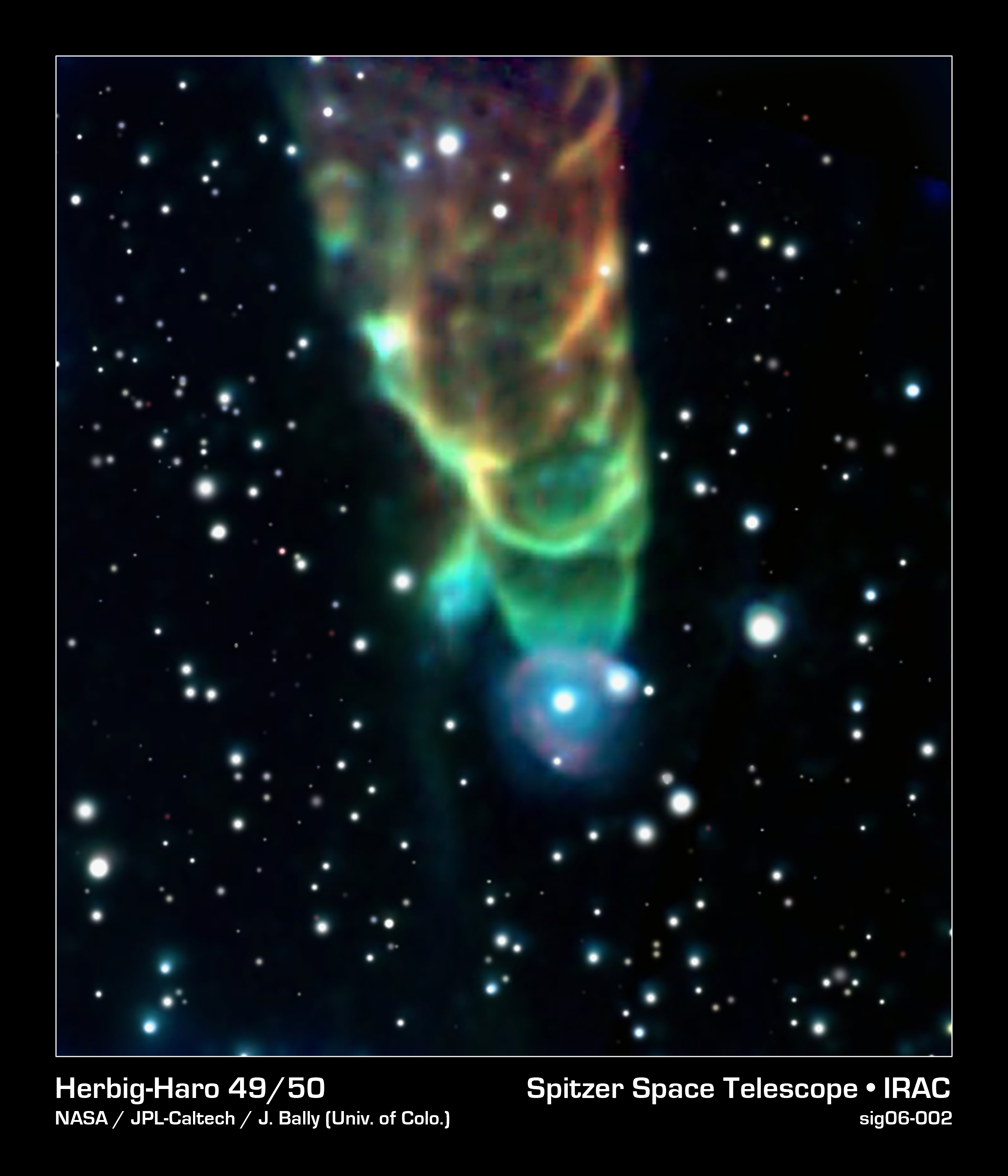
HH 49/50 seen in infrared by the Spitzer Space Telescope

HH objects associated with very young stars or very massive protostars are often hidden from view at optical wavelengths by the cloud of gas and dust from which they form. The intervening material can diminish the visual magnitude by factors of tens or even hundreds at optical wavelengths. Such deeply embedded objects can only be observed at infrared or radio wavelengths, usually in the frequencies of hot molecular hydrogen or warm carbon monoxide emission. In recent years, infrared images have revealed dozens of examples of "infrared HH objects". Most look like bow waves (similar to the waves at the head of a ship), and so are usually referred to as molecular "bow shocks". The physics of infrared bow shocks can be understood in much the same way as that of HH objects, since these objects are essentially the same – supersonic shocks driven by collimated jets from the opposite poles of a protostar. It is only the conditions in the jet and surrounding cloud that are different, causing infrared emission from molecules rather than optical emission from atoms and ions.

In 2009 the acronym "MHO", for Molecular Hydrogen emission-line Object, was approved for such objects, detected in near-infrared, by the International Astronomical Union Working Group on Designations, and has been entered into their on-line Reference Dictionary of Nomenclature of Celestial Objects. As of 2010, almost 1000 objects are contained in the MHO catalog.

== Ultraviolet Herbig-Haro objects ==
HH objects have been observed in the ultraviolet spectrum.

== See also ==
- Bipolar outflow
- Protostar
- Protoplanetary disk
