= Guillermo Haro =

Mexican astronomer

Guillermo Haro Barraza
- Dr. Guillermo Haro Barraza
- Born: 21 March 1913; Mexico City, Mexico
- Died: 26 April 1988 (aged 75)
- Education: National Autonomous University of Mexico (UNAM)
- Spouse(s): Gladys Learn Rojas; Elena Poniatowska
- Scientific career
- Fields: Astronomy

Guillermo Haro Barraza (Spanish pronunciation: [ɡiˈʝeɾmo ˈaɾo βaˈrasa]; 21 March 1913 – 26 April 1988) was a Mexican astronomer. Through his own astronomical research and the formation of new institutions, Haro was influential in the development of modern observational astronomy in Mexico. Internationally, he is best known for his contribution to the discovery of Herbig–Haro objects.

== Early life ==
Haro was born in Mexico City on 21 March 1913 to Ignacio Haro and Leonor Barraza. He studied philosophy and law at the National Autonomous University of Mexico (UNAM). While working as a reporter for Excélsior, Haro became interested in astronomy after a 1937 interview with Luis Enrique Erro. As a result of his dedication and enthusiasm for astronomy, he was hired by Erro in 1943 as an assistant at the newly founded Observatorio Astrofísico de Tonantzintla. Erro arranged for Haro to further his astronomical training in the United States at the Harvard College Observatory, Case Observatory (1944), Yerkes Observatory and McDonald Observatory (1945 to 1947).

== Career ==
Upon his return to Mexico in 1945, Haro continued working at the Observatorio Astrofísico de Tonantzintla where he was responsible for the commissioning of the new 24-31-inch Schmidt camera and where he became involved in the study of extremely red and extremely blue stars. In 1947 he started working for the Observatorio de Tacubaya of the UNAM.

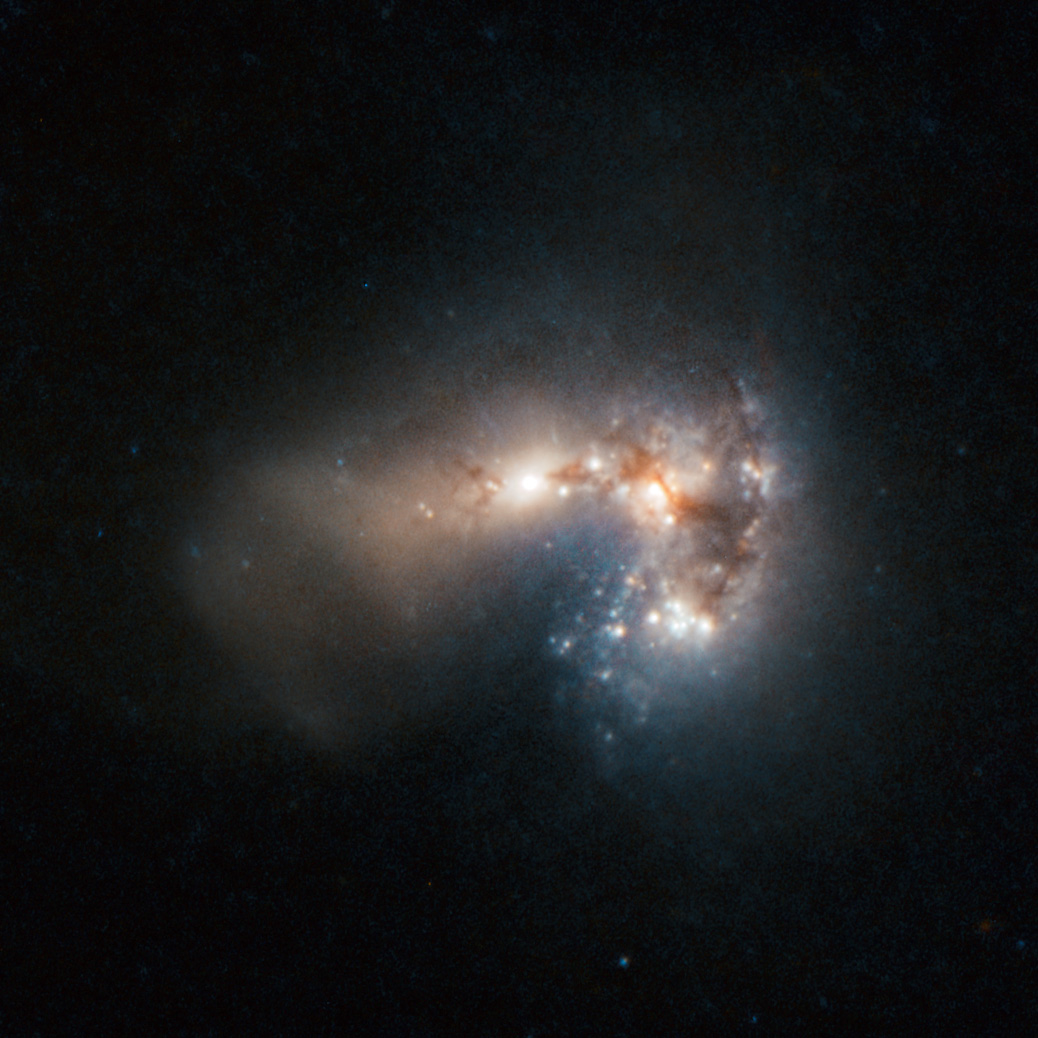
Frenzied Star Birth in Haro 11. This image was obtained by combining data from ESO's Very Large Telescope and the NASA/ESA Hubble Space Telescope.

Haro's contributions to observational astronomy, were primarily made using the Tonantzintla Schmidt telescope. Among them were the detection of a large number of planetary nebulae in the direction of the Galactic Center and the discovery (also independently done by George Herbig) of the nonstellar condensations in high density clouds near regions of recent star formation (now called Herbig–Haro objects). Haro and co-workers discovered flare stars in the Orion nebula region, and later on in stellar aggregates of different ages. His intense activity detecting flare stars continued till the end of his life.

Other major research projects carried out by Haro included the list of 8746 blue stars in the direction of the north galactic pole published jointly with W. J. Luyten in 1961. Work made with the 48-inch Palomar Schmidt using the three-color image technique developed at Tonantzintla. At least 50 of these objects turned out to be quasars (which had not yet been discovered in 1961). Haro's list of 44 blue galaxies, compiled in 1956, was a precursor to the work of Benjamin Markarian and others in searching for such galaxies. Haro also discovered a number of T Tauri stars, one supernova, more than 10 novae, and one comet.

== Major accomplishments ==
Haro was very influential in the development of astronomy in Mexico, not only by virtue of his own astronomical research but also by promoting the development of new institutions. In a more important aspect he defined modern astrophysical research in Mexico where he gave impulse to different initial lines of research and established general scientific policies. Guillermo Haro discovered a new type of large nebulae with American colleague George Herbig - that were named Herbig-Haro objects.

Haro became a member of the Colegio Nacional at age 40, the youngest person to do so.

In 1959, Haro became the first person from Mexico elected to the Royal Astronomical Society. His students included Silvia Torres-Peimbert and Manuel Peimbert.

Haro founded the Mexican Academy of Sciences (first president 1960) and the National Institute of Astrophysics, Optics and Electronics (an observatory named after him is in the state of Sonora).

== Recognition ==
Galaxy Haro 11 (H11) is a small galaxy situated in the southern constellation of Sculptor and is named after Haro who first included it in a study published in 1956.

The Guillermo Haro International Program on Advanced Astrophysical Research at INAOE, which was created in August 1995, was named after him.

On 21 March 2018, 105 years after his birth, Google featured Haro in a Google Doodle.

== Personal life ==
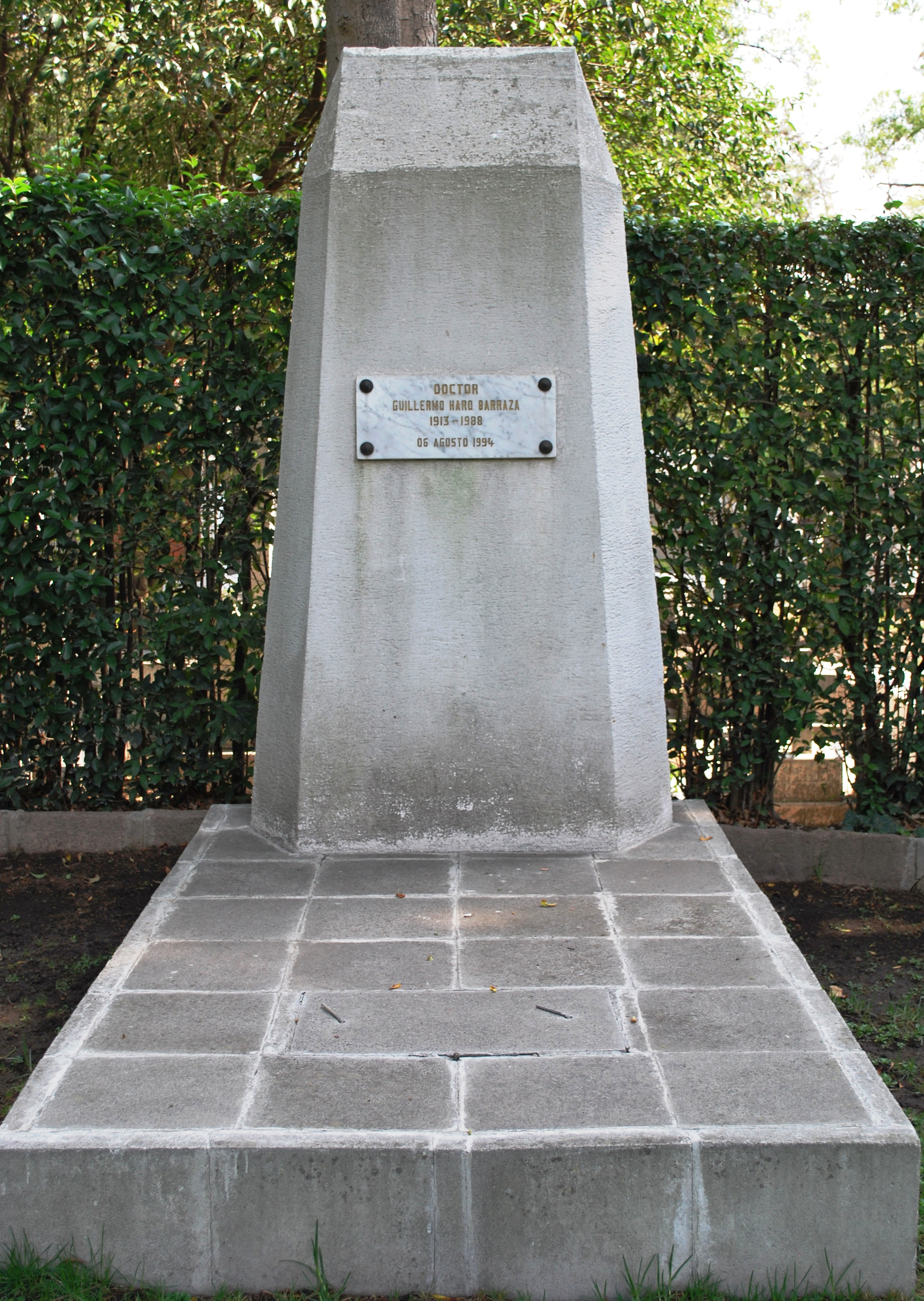
Guillermo Haro's tomb at the Panteón Civil de Dolores.

In 1968, Haro married journalist and writer Elena Poniatowska, with whom he had two children: Felipe and Paula. He was previously divorced from his first wife, Gladys Learn Rojas.

Haro died on 27 April 1988 in Mexico City, and is interred at the Rotonda de las Personas Ilustres of the Panteón Civil de Dolores.

== See also ==
- Guillermo Haro Observatory
