= HH 34 =

Herbig–Haro object located in the Orion nebula

Emission nebula
- Herbig–Haro object
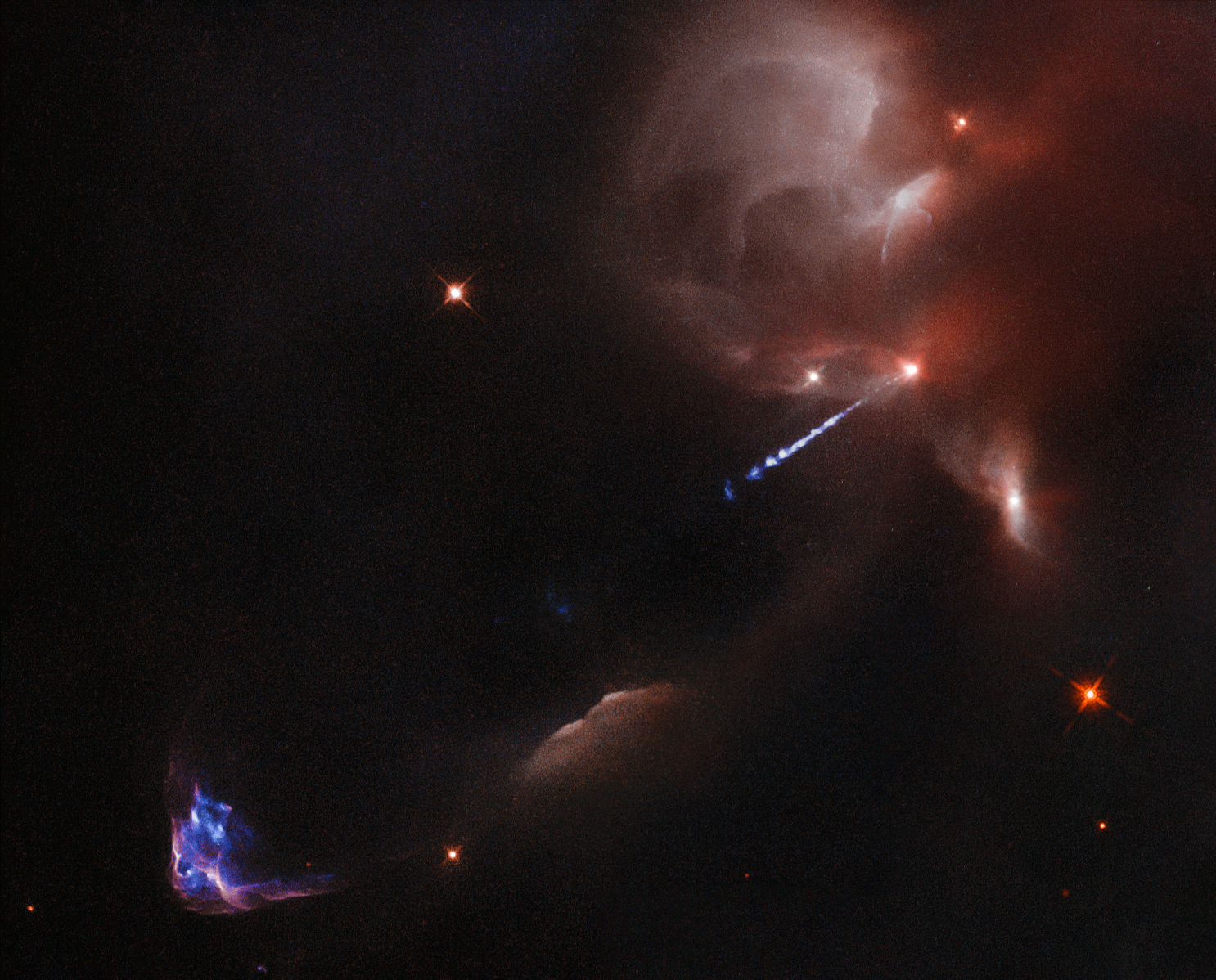
- Image of HH 34 by the Hubble Space Telescope

Observation data: J2000.0 epoch
- Right ascension: 05^{h} 35^{m} 28.28^{s}
- Declination: −06° 28′ 22.2″
- Distance: 1500 ly
- Apparent magnitude (V): 16
- Constellation: Orion
- Designations: HH 34S, [B77] 119, [CM95] Ori A10.

HH 34 is a Herbig–Haro object located in the Constellation of Orion at a distance of about 460 parsecs (1500 light-years). It is located inside the Orion A molecular cloud. The source star is a class I protostar with a total luminosity of 45 L_{☉}.

It is notable for its highly collimated jet and very symmetric bow shocks. Two bow shocks separated by 0.44 parsecs make the primary HH 34 system. Several larger and fainter bow shocks were later discovered on either side, making the extent of the system around 3 parsecs. A bipolar jet from the young star is ramming into surrounding medium at supersonic speeds, heating the material to the point of ionization and emission at visual wavelengths. The jet blows up the dusty envelope of the star, giving rise to 0.3 parsec long molecular outflow.

== See also ==
- HH 46/47
- Stellar evolution
- Hayashi track
- Pre-main-sequence star
